= 2022–23 Second Football League (Croatia) =

Druga NL
- Season: 2022–23
- Dates: 19 August 2022 – 4 June 2023
- Champions: Sesvete
- Promoted: Sesvete, Zrinski Jurjevac
- Relegated: Međimurje, Osijek II, Zagorec Krapina
- Top goalscorer: Nikola Marić (24 goals)
- All statistics correct as of 5 June 2023.

The 2022–23 Croatian Second Football League (also known as Druga Nogometna Liga and 2. NL) was the 32nd edition of the third tier of Croatian football league and 1st season of the restructured Druga nogometna liga.

The league was contested by 16 teams and played in a double round robin format.

== Teams ==
=== Changes ===
Vukovar 1991 was promoted to the 2022–23 Prva NL, while 14 eastern, 9 northern, 16 southern, 16 central and 12 western clubs were relegated to 2022–23 Treća NL due new leagues system.

New clubs are Croatia Zmijavci, Sesvete, Osijek II and Opatija which were relegated from 2021–22 Druga HNL and 10 best placed third tier teams with two playoff winners.

Due to the bankruptcy, Inter Zaprešić, who was scheduled to play in the Croatian second level, was dissolved before the season. Croatia Zmijavci was promoted back to Croatian first league to fill their spot.

Now opened spot was taken by the Trnje who beat Hrvatski Vitez Posedarje in the play-offs.

=== Stadia and locations ===
Team	City	Stadium	Capacity	Last season
Belišće	Belišće	Stadion Gradski	5,000	3rd in 3. HNL - east
Bjelovar	Bjelovar	Gradski stadion	4,000	3rd in 3. HNL - north
Dugo Selo	Dugo Selo	Gradski stadion	2,000	2nd in 3. HNL - center
Grobničan	Čavle	Stadion Adelija Haramija Beba	3,000	2nd in 3. HNL - west
Hrvace	Hrvace	Gradski stadion	3,075	3rd in 3. HNL - south
Jadran Luka Ploče	Ploče	Stadion NK Jadran	2,000	1st in 3. HNL - south
Jadran Poreč	Poreč	Stadion Veli Jože	5,000	3rd in 3. HNL - west
Marsonia 1909	Slavonski Brod	Gradski stadion uz Savu	6,000	4th in 3. HNL - east
Međimurje	Čakovec	SRC Mladost	6,000	5th in 3. HNL - north
Mladost Ždralovi	Ždralovi	Stadion NK Mladost	1,500	2nd in 3. HNL - north
Opatija	Opatija	Stadion Kantrida	10,600	16th in 2. HNL
Osijek II	Osijek	Stadion Gradski vrt	19,220	15th in 2. HNL
Sesvete	Sesvete	Stadion Sveti Josip radnik	2,000	14th in 2. HNL
Trnje	Zagreb	Stadion ŠC Rudeš	2,000	3rd in 3. HNL - center
Zagorec	Krapina	ŠRC Podgora	2,000	1st in 3. HNL - center
Zrinski Jurjevac	Punitovci	Stadion Bara	1,000	2nd in 3. HNL - east

Locations of teams in 2022–23 Druga NL

Rank	Counties of Croatia	Number of teams	Club(s)
1	Osijek-Baranja	3	Belišće, Osijek II, Zrinski
2	Bjelovar-Bilogora	2	Bjelovar, Mladost
2	Primorje-Gorski Kotar	2	Opatija, Grobničan
2	City of Zagreb	2	Sesvete, Trnje
3	Brod-Posavina	1	Marsonia 1909
3	Dubrovnik-Neretva	1	Jadran Luka Ploče
3	Istria	1	Jadran Poreč
3	Krapina-Zagorje	1	Krapina
3	Međimurje	1	Međimurje
3	Split-Dalmatia	1	Hrvace
3	Zagreb	1	Dugo Selo

== League table ==
Pos	Team	Pld	W	D	L	GF	GA	GD	Pts	Qualification or relegation
1	Sesvete (C, P)	30	19	8	3	64	24	+40	65	Promotion to the First Football League
2	Zrinski Jurjevac (P)	30	19	6	5	45	22	+23	63	Promotion to the First Football League
3	Jadran Luka Ploče	30	17	9	4	54	23	+31	60	
4	Mladost Ždralovi	30	14	8	8	48	26	+22	50	
5	Bjelovar	30	12	10	8	46	31	+15	46	
6	Dugo Selo	30	12	9	9	50	43	+7	45	
7	Opatija	30	12	9	9	48	42	+6	45	
8	Hrvace	30	10	8	12	48	49	−1	38	
9	Belišće	30	10	7	13	39	47	−8	37	
10	Jadran Poreč	30	9	9	12	51	61	−10	36	
11	Marsonia 1909	30	11	3	16	40	52	−12	36	
12	Grobničan	30	10	5	15	42	44	−2	35	
13	Trnje	30	9	7	14	43	55	−12	34	
14	Zagorec Krapina (R)	30	9	7	14	36	53	−17	34	Relegation to the Third Football League
15	Osijek II (R)	30	7	4	19	32	64	−32	25	Relegation to the Third Football League
16	Međimurje (R)	30	4	3	23	22	72	−50	15	Relegation to the Third Football League

Updated to match(es) played on 5 June 2023. Source: Druga-NL.com
Rules for classification: 1) Points; 2) Head-to-head points; 3) Head-to-head goal difference; 4) Head-to-head goals scored (at home if two teams tied); 5) Goal difference; 6) Goals scored; 7) Play-off
(Note: Criteria 2-4 and 7 is only used if deciding champion, teams for promotion or relegation and in that case criteria 6 will not be used).
(C) Champions; (P) Promoted; (R) Relegated

== Results ==
Home \ Away	BEL	BJE	DSE	GRO	HRV	JLP	JPO	MAR	MEĐ	MLA	OPA	OSI	SES	TRN	ZAG	ZRI
Belišće	—	0–0	0–5	2–1	3–0	0–2	1–1	2–0	2–1	1–1	1–2	1–0	0–1	3–0	1–3	1–3
Bjelovar	2–2	—	4–1	4–1	0–0	0–0	3–1	2–0	1–2	3–2	1–1	3–1	1–3	3–1	1–1	0–1
Dugo Selo	0–1	1–1	—	1–1	3–2	0–2	5–3	0–4	3–0	0–0	2–1	2–0	0–2	2–2	2–0	0–1
Grobničan	5–1	1–1	3–3	—	0–0	0–1	4–1	0–1	3–1	1–0	1–2	1–0	0–1	2–0	2–0	0–3
Hrvace	0–1	0–3	0–3	2–2	—	1–1	4–3	4–1	2–0	1–1	5–1	3–0	2–4	2–3	2–0	1–2
Jadran LP	3–1	0–0	2–1	3–2	1–0	—	3–1	3–0	6–2	2–1	4–1	3–1	1–1	6–2	5–1	1–1
Jadran Poreč	2–2	1–1	3–3	1–0	3–3	1–0	—	3–2	6–0	1–0	2–0	3–0	0–2	2–1	1–1	1–2
Marsonia	2–1	0–2	2–2	1–0	3–0	1–0	3–2	—	1–3	0–1	1–1	2–2	0–2	4–2	1–3	1–2
Međimurje	4–3	0–1	0–2	0–2	0–1	0–2	0–1	0–1	—	0–5	0–5	0–3	2–2	1–1	0–2	0–1
Mladost Ždralovi	2–0	0–1	0–2	3–1	6–4	2–0	4–0	2–1	2–0	—	1–1	3–0	0–0	0–1	4–3	0–0
Opatija	1–1	0–5	5–0	2–0	2–0	1–1	1–1	2–1	5–3	1–1	—	1–1	1–0	2–1	3–0	1–2
Osijek II	0–3	2–1	0–2	3–1	0–0	1–1	4–2	1–3	2–0	0–4	1–3	—	0–2	3–2	1–2	4–2
Sesvete	2–0	3–0	1–1	4–2	0–3	0–1	4–1	7–1	2–0	1–0	1–1	5–0	—	5–3	4–0	0–0
Trnje	2–0	2–1	0–2	0–3	1–1	0–0	3–3	2–1	3–0	0–1	2–0	4–1	1–1	—	1–0	1–3
Zagorec	1–4	3–1	1–1	1–2	0–2	0–0	1–1	0–2	1–1	1–2	2–1	3–1	2–2	3–2	—	1–0
Zrinski	1–1	1–0	2–1	2–1	2–3	1–0	4–0	1–0	1–2	0–0	1–0	2–0	1–2	0–0	3–0	—

Updated to match(es) played on 4 June 2023. Source: Druga NL (in Croatian)
Legend: Blue = home team win; Yellow = draw; Red = away team win.
For upcoming matches, an "a" indicates there is an article about the rivalry between the two participants.

== Promotion play-offs ==
Team 1	Agg.	Team 2	1st leg	2nd leg
Kustošija	2–2	Zrinski Jurjevac	2–1	0–1

== Relegation play-offs ==
Team 1	Agg.	Team 2	1st leg	2nd leg
Zagorec Krapina	0–1	Krk	0–0	0–1
Zadar	2–4	Karlovac 1919	1–2	1–2
Slavonija Požega	4–5	Radnik Križevci	3–0	1–5

14th place Zagorec Krapina was joined by winners of 5 groups of Third Football League. 3 winners of these matches qualified to 2023-24 Second Football League.
