= 2016–17 Croatian Third Football League =

The 2016–17 Treća HNL season is the 26th since its establishment.

The league consists of three regional groups, Istok (East), Jug (South) and Zapad (West).

== Overview before the season ==
50 teams will join the league, including two relegated from the 2015–16 Druga HNL and five promoted from the lower leagues.

Relegated from 2015–16 Druga HNL

- Segesta (Druga HNL→Treća HNL West)
- Zadar (Druga HNL→Treća HNL South)

Promoted from 2015–16 Treća HNL

- Novigrad (Treća HNL West→Druga HNL)
- Solin (Treća HNL South→Druga HNL)

Relegated from 2015–16 Treća HNL

- Mladost Antin (Treća HNL East→Inter-county league of East)
- Podravina (Treća HNL East→Inter-county league of North−Group Čakovec-Varždin)
- Špansko (Treća HNL West→Inter-county league of Center)
- Zagora (Treća HNL South→First League of Šibenik-Knin county)
- Mosor (Treća HNL South→First League of Split-Dalmatia county)

Promoted from 2015–16 Inter-county leagues and County leagues

- Bedem Ivankovo (Inter-county league of East→Treća HNL East)
- Kustošija (Inter-county league of Center→Treća HNL West)
- Jadran Poreč (Inter-county league of West→Treća HNL West)
- Orkan (First League of Split-Dalmatia county→Treća HNL South)
- GOŠK Dubrovnik 1919 (First League of Dubrovnik-Neretva county→Treća HNL South)

== Group ==
=== East ===
Treća HNL East
- Season: 2016–17
- Matches: 144
- Goals: 347 (2.41 per match)
- Top goalscorer: 11 goals Josip Špoljarić (Osijek II); Nenad Erić (Međimurje); Ivan Jakešević (Slavonija)
- Biggest home win: Varaždin 6−1 Bjelovar; Vukovar '91 5−0 Slavonija; Belišće 5−0 Đakovo Croatia
- Biggest away win: Đakovo Croatia 1−5 Osijek II
- Highest scoring: Varaždin 6−1 Bjelovar; Višnjevac 2−5 Osijek II
- All statistics correct as of 22 March 2017.

==== Stadia and locations ====
Location of teams in 2016–17 Treća HNL East

| Team | Home city | Stadium | Capacity |
|---|---|---|---|
| Bedem Ivankovo | Ivankovo | Grac | 1,000 |
| Belišće | Belišće | Gradski stadion | 5,000 |
| Bjelovar | Bjelovar | Gradski stadion | 4,000 |
| BSK | Bijelo Brdo | Igralište BSK-a | 1,000 |
| Đakovo Croatia | Đakovo | Stadion na Pazarištu | 3,000 |
| Koprivnica | Koprivnica | Gradski stadion | 3,500 |
| Marsonia | Slavonski Brod | Stadion uz Savu | 8,000 |
| Međimurje | Čakovec | SRC Mladost | 6,000 |
| Mladost Ždralovi | Ždralovi | Igralište NK Mladosti | 1,000 |
| Oriolik | Oriovac | Igralište NK Oriolika | 1,500 |
| Osijek II | Osijek | Igralište u Donjem gradu | 1,000 |
| Slavija | Pleternica | Stadion Stjepan Zdenko Šivo | 700 |
| Slavonija | Požega | Stadion kraj Orljave | 4,000 |
| Varaždin | Varaždin | Stadion Anđelko Herjavec | 9,099 |
| Višnjevac | Višnjevac | Stadion NK Višnjevca | 1,500 |
| Vukovar '91 | Vukovar | Gradski stadion | 6,000 |

==== League table ====
| Pos | Team | Pld | W | D | L | GF | GA | GD | Pts | Qualification or relegation |
|---|---|---|---|---|---|---|---|---|---|---|
| 1 | Međimurje | 30 | 20 | 4 | 6 | 56 | 25 | +31 | 64 | Promotion to 2017–18 Druga HNL |
| 2 | Varaždin | 30 | 18 | 6 | 6 | 53 | 27 | +26 | 60 | |
| 3 | Osijek II | 29 | 15 | 7 | 7 | 58 | 31 | +27 | 52 | |
| 4 | Bedem Ivankovo | 29 | 15 | 5 | 9 | 49 | 35 | +14 | 50 | |
| 5 | BSK | 29 | 14 | 4 | 11 | 55 | 39 | +16 | 46 | |
| 6 | Marsonia | 29 | 13 | 7 | 9 | 38 | 31 | +7 | 46 | |
| 7 | Slavonija | 29 | 12 | 8 | 9 | 45 | 43 | +2 | 44 | |
| 8 | Mladost Ždralovi | 29 | 12 | 7 | 10 | 27 | 27 | 0 | 43 | |
| 9 | Slavija | 29 | 11 | 8 | 10 | 45 | 32 | +13 | 41 | |
| 10 | Oriolik | 29 | 10 | 8 | 11 | 30 | 30 | 0 | 38 | |
| 11 | Bjelovar | 29 | 11 | 4 | 14 | 34 | 47 | −13 | 37 | |
| 12 | Đakovo Croatia | 29 | 10 | 5 | 14 | 33 | 50 | −17 | 35 | |
| 13 | Vukovar '91 | 29 | 9 | 5 | 15 | 34 | 49 | −15 | 32 | |
| 14 | Belišće | 29 | 8 | 6 | 15 | 37 | 41 | −4 | 30 | |
| 15 | Koprivnica | 29 | 7 | 5 | 17 | 25 | 48 | −23 | 26 | Relegation to 2017–18 Inter-county league |
| 16 | Višnjevac (-1) | 29 | 3 | 3 | 23 | 17 | 82 | −65 | 12 | Relegation to 2017–18 Inter-county league |

Updated to match(es) played on 22 March 2017. Source: Croatian Football Federation (in Croatian)
Rules for classification: 1) Points; 2) Head-to-head points; 3) Head-to-head goal difference; 4) Head-to-head goals scored (at away if two teams tied); 5) Goal difference; 6) Goals scored; 7) Play-off
(Note: Criteria 2-4 and 7 is only used if deciding Champion, or teams for relegation and in that case criteria 6 will not be used).

==== Results ====
| Home \ Away | BED | BEL | BJE | BSK | ĐAK | KOP | MAR | MEĐ | MLŽ | ORI | OSI | SLA | SLO | VAR | VIŠ | VUK |
|---|---|---|---|---|---|---|---|---|---|---|---|---|---|---|---|---|
| Bedem Ivankovo | | 2–1 | | | 3–1 | 4–1 | 1–0 | 3–0 | | | 1–2 | 1–1 | | 4–0 | 2–0 | |
| Belišće | 1–0 | | | 0–1 | 5–0 | | | | 1–1 | | 1–1 | 0–0 | | 0–1 | 2–0 | 3–1 |
| Bjelovar | 2–0 | 2–0 | | 2–1 | 2–1 | | 0–0 | 3–2 | | | 0–2 | 0–1 | | | 0–0 | |
| BSK Bijelo Brdo | 2–3 | | 3–1 | | | 2–0 | | 2–1 | 1–0 | 2–1 | | 5–2 | 0–1 | | | 0–0 |
| Đakovo-Croatia | | | | 2–1 | | 0–0 | 1–2 | 0–1 | 2–0 | 1–0 | 1–5 | | 2–0 | 2–1 | | |
| Koprivnica | | 2–1 | 2–0 | 1–1 | | | | | 0–1 | 0–1 | | 0–1 | 2–1 | 1–2 | | 1–0 |
| Marsonia | | 3–2 | | 1–0 | 4–1 | 3–2 | | 0–1 | 0–1 | | | | 3–1 | 0–3 | | 1–2 |
| Međimurje | | 2–1 | | 2–1 | | 3–0 | | | 2–1 | 1–1 | | | 1–2 | 0–0 | 5–2 | 1–1 |
| Mladost Ždralovi | 0–0 | | 0–0 | | | | | | | 1–0 | | 1–0 | 1–0 | | 1–0 | 2–1 |
| Oriolik | 2–0 | 0–0 | 2–0 | | 2–3 | | 0–0 | | | | 1–0 | 2–0 | | | 1–1 | |
| Osijek | | | | 0–0 | 2–1 | 1–1 | 2–0 | 2–0 | 2–0 | | | | | 1–1 | | 1–2 |
| Slavija Pleternica | | | | | 4–1 | 1–1 | 0–0 | 0–2 | | | 1–0 | | | 1–3 | 3–0 | |
| Slavonija | | 2–0 | 2–1 | | 1–1 | | | | | 1–1 | 3–2 | 2–1 | | | 4–0 | |
| Varaždin | 3–0 | 2–0 | 6–1 | 1–3 | | | | | 1–1 | 2–0 | | | 1–0 | | | 1–0 |
| Višnjevac | | | | 0–2 | 0–0 | 1–0 | 1–2 | 0–3 | | | 2–5 | | | 1–0 | | |
| Vukovar 91' | 0–0 | 1–0 | 0–2 | | 2–0 | | | | | 1–0 | | 1–0 | 3–4 | | 2–0 | |

Updated to match(es) played on 27 November 2016. Source: soccerway.com
Legend: Blue = home team win; Yellow = draw; Red = away team win.

=== South ===
Treća HNL South
- Season: 2016–17
- Matches: 153
- Goals: 425 (2.78 per match)
- Top goalscorer: 12 goals Vlatko Blažević(Zadar)
- Biggest home win: Hajduk II 8−0 Val
- Biggest away win: Jadran LP 0−5 OŠK Otok
- Highest scoring: Hajduk II 8−0 Val
- All statistics correct as of 29 November 2016.

==== Stadia and locations ====
Location of teams in 2015–16 Treća HNL South

| Team | Home city | Stadium | Capacity |
|---|---|---|---|
| BŠK Zmaj | Blato | Zlinje | 3,000 |
| Croatia Zmijavci | Zmijavci | ŠRC Marijan Šuto Mrma | 1,000 |
| GOŠK Dubrovnik 1919 | Dubrovnik | Lapad | 3,000 |
| Hajduk II | Split | Poljud | 34,448 |
| Hrvace | Hrvace | Gradski stadion | 3,075 |
| Jadran LP | Ploče | Igralište NK Jadrana | 2,000 |
| Junak | Sinj | Gradski stadion | 3,096 |
| Kamen Ivanbegovina | Ivanbegovina | Igralište NK Kamena | 1,000 |
| Neretva | Metković | Igralište iza Vage | 2,000 |
| Neretvanac | Opuzen | Podvornica | 2,500 |
| Omiš | Omiš | Stadion Anđelko Marušić-Ferata | 5,000 |
| Orkan | Dugi Rat | ŠRC Dalmacija | 3,000 |
| OŠK Otok | Otok | Igralište NK Otok | 450 |
| Primorac B/M | Biograd na Moru | Gradski stadion Kazimir i Silvio | 1,500 |
| Primorac 1929 | Stobreč | Igralište u Blatu | 3,600 |
| Val | Kaštel Stari | Vukovar | 2,000 |
| Zadar | Zadar | Stanovi | 5,860 |
| Zmaj Makarska | Makarska | Gradski sportski centar | 5,000 |

==== League table ====
| Pos | Team | Pld | W | D | L | GF | GA | GD | Pts | Qualification or relegation |
|---|---|---|---|---|---|---|---|---|---|---|
| 1 | Hajduk II | 33 | 22 | 5 | 6 | 82 | 28 | +54 | 71 | Promotion to 2017–18 Druga HNL |
| 2 | Hrvace | 32 | 17 | 9 | 6 | 56 | 23 | +33 | 60 | |
| 3 | Croatia Zmijavci | 33 | 17 | 6 | 10 | 51 | 30 | +21 | 57 | |
| 4 | Neretvanac | 33 | 15 | 6 | 12 | 57 | 56 | +1 | 51 | |
| 5 | Zadar | 33 | 13 | 10 | 10 | 50 | 37 | +13 | 49 | |
| 6 | Primorac B/M | 32 | 14 | 4 | 14 | 52 | 44 | +8 | 46 | |
| 7 | Junak | 32 | 13 | 7 | 12 | 34 | 29 | +5 | 46 | |
| 8 | GOŠK Dubrovnik 1919 | 33 | 13 | 7 | 13 | 40 | 42 | −2 | 46 | |
| 9 | Jadran LP | 33 | 14 | 4 | 15 | 36 | 49 | −13 | 46 | |
| 10 | Kamen Ivanbegovina | 32 | 13 | 6 | 13 | 42 | 53 | −11 | 45 | |
| 11 | Zmaj Makarska | 33 | 13 | 4 | 16 | 53 | 50 | +3 | 43 | |
| 12 | OŠK Otok | 33 | 12 | 6 | 15 | 41 | 49 | −8 | 42 | |
| 13 | Val | 33 | 12 | 6 | 15 | 34 | 53 | −19 | 42 | |
| 14 | Primorac 1929 | 32 | 11 | 6 | 15 | 35 | 54 | −19 | 39 | |
| 15 | Neretva | 27 | 11 | 5 | 11 | 36 | 36 | 0 | 38 | Relegation to 2017–18 County league |
| 16 | BŠK Zmaj | 33 | 9 | 8 | 16 | 50 | 63 | −13 | 35 | Relegation to 2017–18 County league |
| 17 | Omiš | 33 | 9 | 6 | 18 | 35 | 53 | −18 | 33 | Relegation to 2017–18 County league |
| 18 | Orkan | 32 | 7 | 7 | 18 | 36 | 61 | −25 | 28 | Relegation to 2017–18 County league |

Updated to match(es) played on 29 November 2016. Source: Croatian Football Federation (in Croatian)
Rules for classification: 1) Points; 2) Head-to-head points; 3) Head-to-head goal difference; 4) Head-to-head goals scored (at away if two teams tied); 5) Goal difference; 6) Goals scored; 7) Play-off
(Note: Criteria 2-4 and 7 is only used if deciding Champion, or teams for relegation and in that case criteria 6 will not be used).

==== Results ====
| Home \ Away | BŠK | CRO | GOŠ | HAJ | HRV | JAD | JUN | KAM | NEA | NEC | OMI | ORK | OŠK | PBM | PRI | VAL | ZAD | ZMA |
|---|---|---|---|---|---|---|---|---|---|---|---|---|---|---|---|---|---|---|
| BŠK Zmaj | | 1–4 | | | | | | | | | 3–3 | 3–0 | | 0–1 | 4–0 | 1–1 | 2–0 | 2–0 |
| Croatia Zmijavci | | | 0–1 | 2–1 | | 1–0 | | | | 2–2 | | 0–2 | | 1–1 | 5–0 | 4–0 | | 3–0 |
| GOŠK | 3–1 | | | 0–2 | 0–0 | | 2–1 | 2–2 | 2–1 | 2–0 | | | 0–0 | | | | 0–0 | |
| Hajduk II | 1–2 | | | | | | | 4–0 | 0–1 | | | 2–0 | 3–0 | 4–2 | | 8–0 | | 3–1 |
| Hrvace | 4–3 | 3–2 | | 1–1 | | | 0–1 | 3–3 | 1–0 | | 2–0 | | 6–0 | | | | 0–0 | |
| Jadran LP | 3–0 | | 2–1 | 1–1 | 2–3 | | 2–1 | 0–2 | 1–2 | 0–3 | | | 0–5 | | | | | |
| Junak | 3–0 | 2–0 | | 2–4 | | | | 0–0 | 2–1 | | 0–1 | | 1–0 | | 0–0 | | 1–0 | |
| Kamen Ivanbegovina | 1–0 | 2–2 | | | | | | | 0–0 | | 2–0 | | 2–0 | 2–0 | 1–2 | | 2–0 | |
| Neretva | 1–0 | 0–2 | | | | | | | | | 3–2 | 1–1 | 1–3 | 3–1 | 3–2 | | 2–1 | |
| Neretvanac | 3–2 | | | 1–3 | 2–2 | | 1–0 | 3–0 | 2–0 | | 3–1 | | 1–0 | | | | 1–2 | |
| Omiš | | 2–4 | 0–1 | 1–2 | | 2–0 | | | | | | 2–1 | | 2–1 | 0–0 | 3–0 | | 1–1 |
| Orkan | | | 0–3 | | 0–0 | 0–1 | 2–0 | 3–0 | | 2–2 | | | | | | 4–1 | | 3–3 |
| OŠK Otok | 2–0 | 1–0 | | | | | | | | | 3–2 | 2–1 | | 2–3 | 2–0 | | 2–2 | 2–0 |
| Primorac B/M | | | 2–0 | | 0–1 | 2–0 | 1–0 | | | 0–2 | | 2–1 | | | | 3–1 | | 5–1 |
| Primorac 1929 | | | 2–2 | 0–4 | 0–1 | 2–1 | | | | 3–0 | | 1–1 | | 1–0 | | 3–0 | | 2–0 |
| Val | | | 0–0 | | 1–0 | 4–1 | 1–0 | 3–1 | 1–1 | 2–1 | | | 2–1 | | | | | |
| Zadar | | 2–0 | | 1–0 | | 0–0 | | | | | 1–0 | 6–0 | | 1–1 | 4–0 | 2–0 | | 1–1 |
| Zmaj Makarska | | | 2–0 | | 1–1 | 1–2 | 3–1 | 1–2 | 1–1 | 2–3 | | | | | | 1–1 | | |

Updated to match(es) played on 29 November 2016. Source: soccerway.com
Legend: Blue = home team win; Yellow = draw; Red = away team win.

=== West ===
Treća HNL West
- Season: 2016–17
- Champions: NK Vinogradar
- Promoted: NK Kustošija
- Matches: 120
- Goals: 334 (2.78 per match)
- Top goalscorer: 10 goals Goran Ljubojević (Vinogradar)
- Biggest home win: Krk 4−0 Segesta; Maksimir 5−1 Zagorec; Vrapče 5-1 Opatija
- Biggest away win: Jadran Poreč 0−5 Vinogradar
- Highest scoring: Kustošija 4−3 Opatija
- All statistics correct as of 5 June 2017.

==== Stadia and locations ====
Location of teams in 2016–17 Treća HNL West

| Team | Home city | Stadium | Capacity |
|---|---|---|---|
| Dubrava | Zagreb | ŠRC Grana-Klaka | 2,000 |
| Dugo Selo | Dugo Selo | Gradski stadion | 2,000 |
| HAŠK | Zagreb | ŠRC Pešćenica | 3,000 |
| Jadran Poreč | Poreč | Veli Jože | 2,000 |
| Krk | Krk | SRC Josip Uravić Pepi | 500 |
| Kustošija | Zagreb | Igralište Kustošije | 2,550 |
| Maksimir | Zagreb | Oboj | 247 |
| Opatija | Opatija | Stadion NK Opatije | 2,000 |
| Samobor | Samobor | SC NK Samobor | 5,000 |
| Segesta | Sisak | Gradski stadion | 8,000 |
| Stupnik | Gornji Stupnik | SRC Stupnik | 1,000 |
| Trnje | Zagreb | Stadion Trnja | 1,000 |
| Vinogradar | Jastrebarsko | Mladina | 2,000 |
| Vrapče | Zagreb | Igralište Vrapča | 1,000 |
| Vrbovec | Vrbovec | Gradski stadion kraj Sajmišta | 4,000 |
| Zagorec | Krapina | ŠRC Podgora | 2,000 |

==== League table ====
| Pos | Team | Pld | W | D | L | GF | GA | GD | Pts | Qualification or relegation |
|---|---|---|---|---|---|---|---|---|---|---|
| 1 | Vinogradar | 30 | 20 | 6 | 4 | 69 | 19 | +50 | 66 | Promotion to 2017–18 Druga HNL |
| 2 | Kustošija | 30 | 16 | 6 | 8 | 59 | 35 | +24 | 54 | |
| 3 | Trnje | 30 | 16 | 6 | 8 | 44 | 24 | +20 | 54 | |
| 4 | Krk | 30 | 15 | 5 | 10 | 47 | 36 | +11 | 50 | |
| 5 | Opatija | 30 | 14 | 7 | 9 | 58 | 51 | +7 | 49 | |
| 6 | Vrapče | 30 | 12 | 8 | 10 | 49 | 38 | +11 | 44 | |
| 7 | Jadran Poreč | 30 | 12 | 7 | 11 | 50 | 53 | −3 | 43 | |
| 8 | HAŠK | 30 | 12 | 5 | 13 | 51 | 49 | +2 | 41 | |
| 9 | Dubrava | 30 | 11 | 8 | 11 | 38 | 46 | −8 | 41 | |
| 10 | Maksimir | 30 | 9 | 9 | 12 | 35 | 40 | −5 | 36 | |
| 11 | Segesta | 30 | 8 | 12 | 10 | 45 | 53 | −8 | 36 | |
| 12 | Vrbovec | 30 | 9 | 6 | 15 | 45 | 54 | −9 | 33 | |
| 13 | Dugo Selo | 30 | 9 | 6 | 15 | 33 | 51 | −18 | 33 | |
| 14 | Zagorec | 30 | 9 | 5 | 16 | 37 | 59 | −22 | 32 | Relegation to 2017–18 Inter-county league |
| 15 | Samobor | 30 | 6 | 10 | 14 | 29 | 37 | −8 | 28 | Relegation to 2017–18 Inter-county league |
| 16 | Stupnik | 30 | 5 | 8 | 17 | 47 | 91 | −44 | 23 | Relegation to 2017–18 Inter-county league |

Updated to match(es) played on 25 April 2017. Source: Croatian Football Federation (in Croatian)
Rules for classification: 1) Points; 2) Head-to-head points; 3) Head-to-head goal difference; 4) Head-to-head goals scored (at away if two teams tied); 5) Goal difference; 6) Goals scored; 7) Play-off
(Note: Criteria 2-4 and 7 is only used if deciding Champion, or teams for relegation and in that case criteria 6 will not be used).

==== Results ====
| Home \ Away | DUB | DUG | HAŠ | JAD | KRK | KUS | MAK | OPA | SAM | SEG | STU | TRN | VIN | VRA | VRB | ZAG |
|---|---|---|---|---|---|---|---|---|---|---|---|---|---|---|---|---|
| Dubrava | | 3–0 | 3–3 | 0–0 | 2–0 | 2–1 | 1–5 | 2–4 | 3–2 | 1–1 | 2–1 | 0–0 | 2–1 | 2–3 | 0–0 | 3–0 |
| Dugo Selo | 1–2 | | 1–0 | 2–1 | 0–1 | 0–1 | 1–1 | 1–3 | 2–1 | 3–2 | 3–1 | 1–0 | 0–4 | 2–2 | 1–0 | 2–0 |
| HAŠK | 1–2 | 2–1 | | 0–3 | 1–4 | 2–1 | 1–0 | 3–5 | 1–1 | 2–2 | 1–1 | 1–0 | 0–3 | 0–1 | 4–0 | 3–3 |
| Jadran | 0–0 | 0–1 | 2–1 | | 2–1 | 3–2 | 3–0 | 3–3 | 1–0 | 2–2 | 7–5 | 2–4 | 0–5 | 1–1 | 3–2 | 3–0 |
| Krk | 2–0 | 1–0 | 1–0 | 0–0 | | 2–1 | 1–0 | 2–2 | 2–3 | 4–0 | 2–3 | 2–2 | 0–0 | 2–1 | 1–4 | 1–2 |
| Kustošija | 2–1 | 5–0 | 1–2 | 5–1 | 1–3 | | 1–0 | 4–3 | 1–1 | 0–2 | 2–2 | 1–0 | 0–0 | 2–1 | 3–1 | 4–2 |
| Maksimir | 0–1 | 1–1 | 0–4 | 3–2 | 2–0 | 0–2 | | 2–4 | 2–1 | 0–1 | 3–1 | 2–2 | 0–2 | 1–0 | 0–0 | 5–1 |
| Opatija | 2–0 | 2–3 | 2–1 | 0–1 | 0–2 | 2–1 | 0–1 | | 1–1 | 1–1 | 6–3 | 2–1 | 0–0 | 3–2 | 1–0 | 2–1 |
| Samobor | 3–0 | 0–0 | 1–2 | 1–0 | 0–1 | 0–1 | 1–1 | 0–2 | | 3–3 | 0–0 | 0–0 | 0–1 | 2–3 | 2–0 | 1–0 |
| Segesta | 1–1 | 3–2 | 1–3 | 3–1 | 2–1 | 0–2 | 0–0 | 2–2 | 0–0 | | 2–2 | 1–3 | 1–1 | 3–1 | 2–2 | 4–2 |
| Stupnik | 2–2 | 2–2 | 4–2 | 3–2 | 1–5 | 0–3 | 3–3 | 3–2 | 3–3 | 0–2 | | 0–6 | 1–4 | 2–0 | 1–5 | 0–1 |
| Trnje | 2–0 | 1–0 | 3–0 | 1–2 | 1–0 | 0–0 | 2–0 | 1–0 | 2–0 | 2–1 | 1–0 | | 0–2 | 0–2 | 4–0 | 2–0 |
| Vinogradar | 4–0 | 4–0 | 3–1 | 4–0 | 1–1 | 1–4 | 2–0 | 3–0 | 1–0 | 4–0 | 6–2 | 0–2 | | 2–1 | 6–2 | 1–0 |
| Vrapče | 2–1 | 2–1 | 0–4 | 2–1 | 3–0 | 1–1 | 0–0 | 5–1 | 2–0 | 1–0 | 9–0 | 0–1 | 0–0 | | 1–1 | 0–2 |
| Vrbovec | 3–1 | 3–2 | 0–3 | 0–2 | 1–2 | 2–2 | 0–1 | 1–2 | 1–2 | 4–1 | 1–0 | 4–0 | 1–4 | 1–1 | | 4–1 |
| Zagorec | 0–1 | 2–0 | 0–3 | 2–1 | 1–3 | 1–5 | 2–2 | 1–1 | 1–0 | 3–2 | 4–1 | 1–1 | 1–0 | 2–2 | 1–2 | |

Updated to match(es) played on 26 November 2016. Source: soccerway.com
Legend: Blue = home team win; Yellow = draw; Red = away team win.
