= 2022–23 Third Football League (Croatia) =

Treća NL
- Season: 2022–23
- Dates: 20 August 2022 – 3 June 2023
- Champions: Karlovac 1919, Krk, Radnik Križevci, Slavonija Požega, Zagora Unešić
- Promoted: Karlovac 1919, Krk, Radnik Križevci
- Relegated: Urania (BV), Podravac, Omladinac (GV), Darda, Vrbovec, Ravnice, Papuk

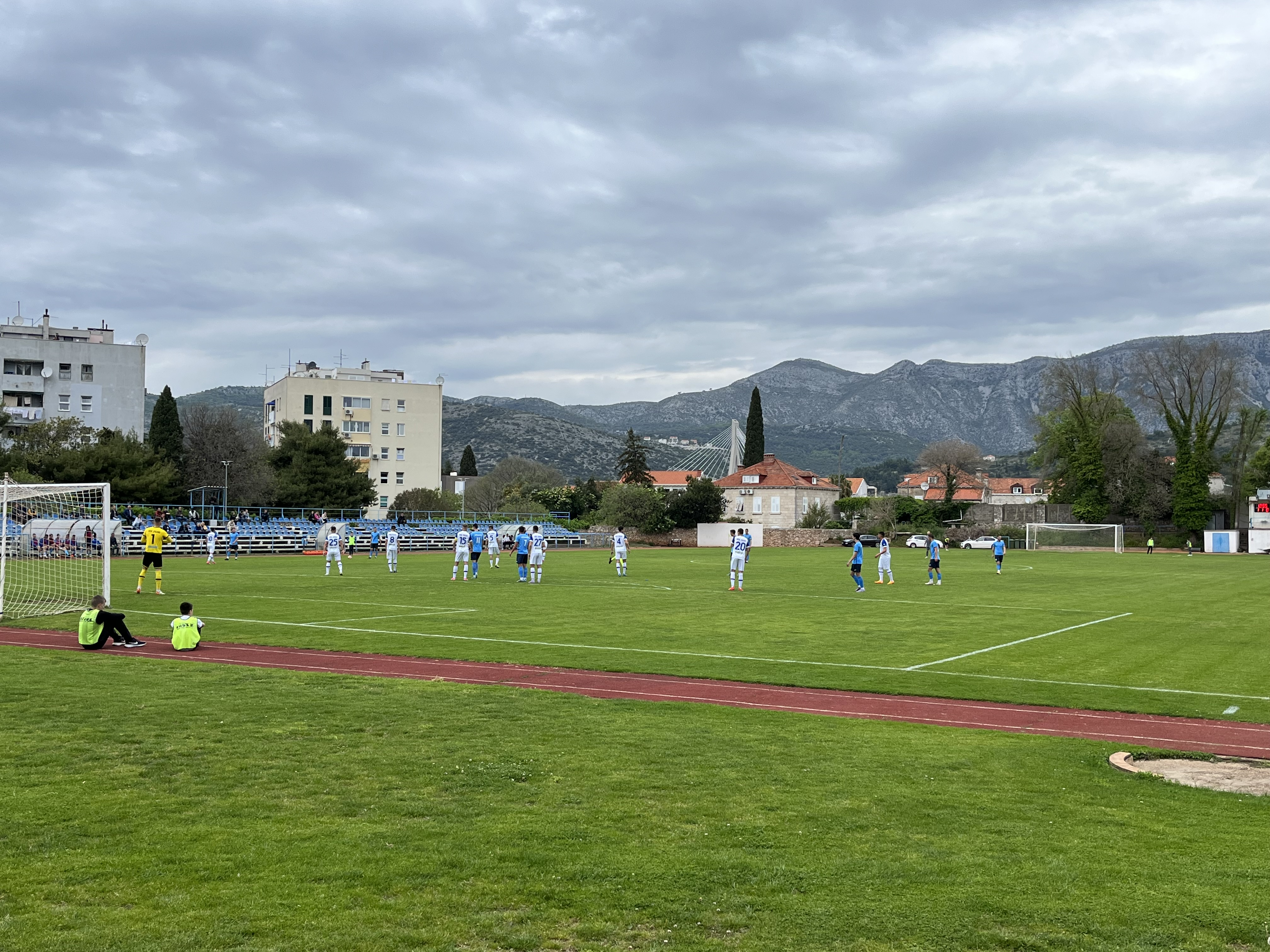
GOŠK Dubrovnik hosting HNK Zadar in April 2023

The 2022–23 Croatian Third Football League (also known as Treća Nogometna Liga and 3. NL) was the 32nd edition of the fourth tier of Croatian football league and 1st season of the restructured Treća nogometna liga.

2022-23 season was the first season where fourth tier competition is named Third Football League, and the first season where fourth tier competition was the highest competition divided in groups (traditionally it being third tier competition).

Winner of every group qualified for the promotion qualifications, as well as the 14th placed team in Second Football League. Those six teams battled for 3 open spots in next seasons' Second Football League.

== Teams ==
The league was contested in 5 groups, based on geographic locations, by between 10 and 18 teams. Groups are based on centers: Varaždin (North), Rijeka (West), Zagreb (Center), Osijek (East) and Split (South).

Location of teams of the 2022–23 Treća NL.
Brown: North; Red: West; Yellow: Center;
Green: East; Blue: South.

== League tables ==
=== North ===
Pos	Team	Pld	W	D	L	GF	GA	GD	Pts	Qualification or relegation
1	Radnik Križevci (C, Q)	27	21	4	2	71	27	+44	67	Promotion play-off
2	Polet (SMnM)	27	21	3	3	65	17	+48	66	
3	Varteks	27	15	6	6	51	31	+20	51	
4	Rudar Mursko Središće	27	13	2	12	47	44	+3	41	
5	Dinamo Domašinec	27	11	4	12	36	46	−10	37	
6	Papuk Orahovica (Note: Papuk Orahovica went bankrupt after the season.) (R)	27	9	5	13	33	59	−26	32	Relegation
7	Koprivnica	27	7	5	15	30	47	−17	26	
8	Virovitica	27	6	4	17	36	54	−18	22	
9	Podravina Ludbreg	27	6	4	17	38	59	−21	22	
10	Podravac Virje (R)	27	6	3	18	34	57	−23	21	Relegation

Updated to match(es) played on 3 June 2023. Source:
Rules for classification: 1) Points, 2) Head-to-head points, 3) Head-to-head goal difference, 4) Goal difference, 5) Matches won, 6) Goals scored
(C) Champions; (Q) Qualified for the phase indicated; (R) Relegated

=== West ===
Pos	Team	Pld	W	D	L	GF	GA	GD	Pts	Qualification or relegation
1	Krk (C, Q)	24	14	5	5	47	18	+29	47	Promotion play-off
2	Vinodol	24	13	4	7	35	25	+10	43	
3	Uljanik	24	13	2	9	39	26	+13	41	
4	Nehaj	24	13	1	10	37	28	+9	40	
5	Pomorac 1921	24	11	4	9	39	38	+1	37	
6	Rudar Labin	24	11	3	10	32	37	−5	36	
7	Kraljevica	24	9	8	7	32	22	+10	35	
8	Naprijed Hreljin	24	8	9	7	24	20	+4	33	
9	Buje	24	10	3	11	37	34	+3	33	
10	Pazinka	24	9	4	11	29	34	−5	31	
11	Cres	24	7	8	9	26	32	−6	29	
12	Crikvenica	24	7	2	15	23	49	−26	23	
13	Medulin 1921	24	2	5	17	15	52	−37	11	
14	Novigrad (Note: NK Novigrad quit competition after 1 game.) (R)	0	0	0	0	0	0	0	0	Relegation

Updated to match(es) played on 27 May 2023. Source:
Rules for classification: 1) Points, 2) Head-to-head points, 3) Head-to-head goal difference, 4) Goal difference, 5) Matches won, 6) Goals scored
(C) Champions; (Q) Qualified for the phase indicated; (R) Relegated

=== Center ===
Pos	Team	Pld	W	D	L	GF	GA	GD	Pts	Qualification or relegation
1	Karlovac 1919 (C, Q)	34	28	3	3	79	12	+67	87	Promotion play-off
2	Maksimir	34	22	2	10	73	48	+25	68	
3	Vrapče	34	19	8	7	61	31	+30	65	
4	Lučko	34	18	4	12	60	46	+14	58	
5	Samobor	34	15	9	10	52	41	+11	54	
6	Ponikve	34	17	2	15	48	48	0	53	
7	Segesta	34	14	6	14	57	40	+17	48	
8	Sava Strmec	34	14	5	15	43	59	−16	47	
9	Trešnjevka	34	14	4	16	52	59	−7	46	
10	Lukavec	34	12	7	15	37	49	−12	43	
11	Gaj Mače	34	13	3	18	52	61	−9	42	
12	Kurilovec	34	10	10	14	38	51	−13	40	
13	HAŠK 1903	34	11	7	16	42	60	−18	40	
14	Mladost Petrinja	34	10	9	15	49	61	−12	39	
15	Bistra	34	11	5	18	44	63	−19	38	
16	Dinamo Odranski Obrež	34	10	7	17	55	67	−12	37	
17	Ravnice (R)	34	9	9	16	36	50	−14	36	Relegation
18	Vrbovec (R)	34	6	6	22	39	71	−32	24	Relegation

Updated to match(es) played on 3 June 2023. Source:
Rules for classification: 1) Points, 2) Head-to-head points, 3) Head-to-head goal difference, 4) Goal difference, 5) Matches won, 6) Goals scored
(C) Champions; (Q) Qualified for the phase indicated; (R) Relegated

=== East ===
Pos	Team	Pld	W	D	L	GF	GA	GD	Pts	Qualification or relegation
1	Slavonija Požega (C, Q)	30	17	8	5	65	36	+29	59	Promotion play-off
2	Graničar Županja	30	18	4	8	56	26	+30	58	
3	NAŠK Našice	30	15	7	8	42	28	+14	52	
4	Kutjevo	30	15	4	11	60	51	+9	49	
5	Čepin	30	13	8	9	54	40	+14	47	
6	Borac Kneževi Vinogradi	30	13	5	12	41	38	+3	44	
7	Slavija Pleternica	30	12	7	11	40	52	−12	43	
8	Oriolik Oriovac	30	12	6	12	42	48	−6	42	
9	Vuteks Sloga	30	12	5	13	49	61	−12	41	
10	Svačić Stari Slatinik	30	12	4	14	53	52	+1	40	
11	Bedem Ivankovo	30	11	5	14	47	55	−8	38	
12	Sloga Nova Gradiška	30	11	5	14	42	63	−21	38	
13	Valpovka	30	10	6	14	52	45	+7	36	
14	Đakovo Croatia	30	10	4	16	51	52	−1	34	
15	Darda (R)	30	8	6	16	58	69	−11	30	Relegation
16	Omladinac Gornja Vrba (R)	30	6	6	18	22	58	−36	24	Relegation

Updated to match(es) played on 3 June 2023. Source:
Rules for classification: 1) Points, 2) Head-to-head points, 3) Head-to-head goal difference, 4) Goal difference, 5) Matches won, 6) Goals scored
(C) Champions; (Q) Qualified for the phase indicated; (R) Relegated

=== South ===
Pos	Team	Pld	W	D	L	GF	GA	GD	Pts	Qualification or relegation
1	Zagora Unešić (Note: Zagora Unešić did not obtain a license for 2. NL.) (C)	30	19	8	3	69	24	+45	65	
2	Zadar (Q)	30	18	6	6	67	31	+36	60	Promotion play-off
3	Junak Sinj	30	15	8	7	53	32	+21	53	
4	Hrvatski Vitez Posedarje	30	13	6	11	53	39	+14	45	
5	Uskok Klis	30	13	6	11	40	35	+5	45	
6	Primorac Biograd	30	13	6	11	48	47	+1	45	
7	GOŠK Kaštela	30	12	6	12	40	38	+2	42	
8	Neretvanac Opuzen	30	12	5	13	38	39	−1	41	
9	Vodice	30	12	5	13	41	47	−6	41	
10	Neretva Metković	30	12	4	14	34	38	−4	40	
11	Sloga Mravince	30	9	12	9	47	39	+8	39	
12	GOŠK Dubrovnik	30	10	7	13	31	44	−13	37	
13	Zmaj Makarska	30	9	7	14	37	54	−17	34	
14	Kamen Ivanbegovina	30	9	4	17	41	84	−43	31	
15	Split	30	7	6	17	27	52	−25	27	
16	Urania Baška Voda (R)	30	7	4	19	27	50	−23	24	Relegation

Updated to match(es) played on 27 May 2023. Source:
Rules for classification: 1) Points, 2) Head-to-head points, 3) Head-to-head goal difference, 4) Goal difference, 5) Matches won, 6) Goals scored
(C) Champions; (Q) Qualified for the phase indicated; (R) Relegated

== Promotion play-offs ==
Team 1	Agg.	Team 2	1st leg	2nd leg
Zagorec Krapina	0–1	Krk	0–0	0–1
Zadar	2–4	Karlovac 1919	1–2	1–2
Slavonija Požega	4–5	Radnik Križevci	3–0	1–5

5 group winners were joined by Zagorec Krapina, who had placed 14th in the 2.NL. 3 winners of these matches qualified to 2023-24 Second Football League.
