= 2023–24 Croatian Football Cup =

SuperSport Hrvatski nogometni kup

Tournament details
- Country: Croatia
- Teams: 48

Final positions
- Champions: Dinamo Zagreb
- Runners-up: Rijeka

Tournament statistics
- Matches played: 48
- Goals scored: 191 (3.98 per match)
- Top goal scorer(s): Dražen Pilčić (10 goals)

The 2023–24 Croatian Football Cup was the 33rd season of Croatia's football knockout competition. It was sponsored by the betting company SuperSport and known as the SuperSport Hrvatski nogometni kup for sponsorship purposes.

Clubs in the competition are financially supported through television and sponsorship rights, with total fund of €190,000.

The defending champions are Hajduk Split, having won their eighth and second consecutive title the previous year by defeating their rivals Šibenik in the final.

== Calendar ==
Round	Date(s)	Number of fixtures	Clubs	New entries this round	Financial sponsorship	Goals / games
Preliminary round	30 August 2023	16	48 → 32	32	€1,200 (home) / €1,000 (guest)	82 / 16
Round of 32	27 September 2023	16	32 → 16	16	€2,000 (home)	61 / 16
Round of 16	1 November 2023	8	16 → 8	none	€2,500 (home)	31 / 8
Quarter-finals	28 February 2024	4	8 → 4	none	€4,000 (home)	11 / 4
Semi-finals	3 April 2024	2	4 → 2	none	€6,000 (home) / €6,000 (guest)	2 / 2
Final	15 and 30 May 2024	1	2 → 1	none	€20,000 (winner) / €7,600 (runner up)	4 / 2

== Participating clubs ==
The following 48 teams qualified for the competition:

Best clubs by cup coefficient 16 clubs	Winners and runners up of county cups 32 clubs
Rijeka; Hajduk Split; Dinamo Zagreb; Lokomotiva; Osijek; Istra 1961; Gorica; Slaven Belupo; Šibenik; Rudeš; Varaždin; Jaska Vinogradar; BSK Bijelo Brdo; Oriolik; Cibalia; Zagreb	Osijek-Baranja County cup winner: Vardarac; Osijek-Baranja County cup runner up: Belišće; Zagreb County cup winner: Dugo Selo; Zagreb County cup runner up: Tigar Sveta Nedelja; Brod-Posavina County cup winner: Omladinac Staro Topolje; Brod-Posavina County cup runner up: Omladinac Gornja Vrba; Vukovar-Srijem County cup winner: Vukovar 1991; Vukovar-Srijem County cup runner up: Graničar Županja; Međimurje County cup winner: Graničar Kotoriba; Međimurje County cup runner up: Međimurec; Koprivnica-Križevci County cup winner: Radnik Križevci; Koprivnica-Križevci County cup runner up: Tomislav Drnje; Istria County cup winner: Jadran Poreč; Istria County cup runner up: Rudar Labin; Sisak-Moslavina County cup winner: Moslavina Kutina; Sisak-Moslavina County cup runner up: Libertas Novska; Virovitica-Podravina County cup winner: Pitomača; Virovitica-Podravina County cup runner up: Papuk; Varaždin County cup winner: Jalžabet; Varaždin County cup runner up: Novi Marof; Bjelovar-Bilogora County cup winner: Mladost Ždralovi; Bjelovar-Bilogora County cup runner up: Bilogora 91; Split-Dalmatia County cup winner: Croatia Zmijavci; City of Zagreb cup winner: Ponikve; Primorje-Gorski Kotar County cup winner: Grobničan; Požega-Slavonia County cup winner: Kutjevo; Zadar County cup winner: Primorac Biograd na Moru; Karlovac County cup winner: Karlovac 1919; Dubrovnik-Neretva County cup winner: Jadran LP; Krapina-Zagorje County cup winner: Zagorec Krapina; Šibenik-Knin County cup winner: Zagora Unešić; Lika-Senj County cup winner: Gospić '91

== Preliminary round ==
The draw for the preliminary single-legged round was held on 19 July 2023 and the matches were played on 30 August 2023.

Tie no.	Home team	Score	Away team
1	Gospić 91	2–4	Kutjevo
2^{***}	Dugo Selo	2–2 (4–2 p)	Pitomača
3^{**}	Tigar Sveta Nedjelja	0–2	Omladinac Gornja Vrba
4^{***}	Papuk Osječko 1664	1–29	Grobničan
5^{****}	Tomislav Drnje	1–4	Jadran LP
6	Vukovar 1991	4–0	Graničar Kotoriba
7	Vardarac	1–2 (aet)	Karlovac 1919
8	Jalžabet	1–3	Moslavina
9	Bilogora 91	0–2	Ponikve
10	Jadran Poreč	2–1	Mladost Ždralovi
11^{*}	Rudar Labin	2–3	Zagora Unešić
12	Graničar Županja	0–3	Croatia Zmijavci
13	Zagorec Krapina	1–0	Omladinac Staro Topolje
14	Belišće	3–0	Novi Marof
15	Primorac BnM	0–2 (aet)	Radnik Križevci
16	Libertas	1–0	Međimurec

* Match played on 19 August.
** Match played on 22 August.
*** Matches played on 29 August.
**** Match played on 31 August.

== Round of 32 ==
The draw was determined according to the principle of opposite numbers, which were assigned based on the club coefficient. Most matches were played on 27 September 2023.

Tie no.	Home team	Score	Away team
1^{***}	Libertas	0–9	Rijeka
2^{*}	Omladinac Gornja Vrba	0–6	Hajduk Split
3	Ponikve	1–4	Dinamo Zagreb
4^{***}	Kutjevo	1–4	Osijek
5	Dugo Selo	0–1	Lokomotiva
6^{**}	Moslavina	2–4	Slaven Belupo
7	Zagora Unešić	0–2	Istra 1961
8	Radnik Križevci	4–3 (aet)	Šibenik
9	Zagorec Krapina	0–2	Gorica
10^{***}	Grobničan	0–0 (3–5 p)	Varaždin
11	Croatia Zmijavci	0–1	Rudeš
12	Vukovar 1991	4–1	BSK Bijelo Brdo
13	Karlovac 1919	2–1	Jaska Vinogradar
14	Jadran Poreč	0–0 (3–4 p)	Oriolik
15	Jadran LP	2–1	Belišće
16^{***}	Cibalia	6–0	Zagreb

* Match played on 13 September.
** Match played on 20 September.
*** Matches played on 26 September.

== Round of 16 ==
The draw was determined according to the principle of opposite numbers, which were assigned based on the club coefficient. The matches were played on 1 November 2023.

Tie no.	Home team	Score	Away team
1^{***}	Cibalia	1–3	Rijeka
2^{*}	Jadran LP	0–2	Hajduk Split
3	Oriolik	0–8	Dinamo Zagreb
4^{*}	Karlovac 1919	0–1	Osijek
5^{**}	Vukovar 1991	1–2	Lokomotiva
6^{*}	Rudeš	3–1	Slaven Belupo
7^{***}	Varaždin	3–2	Istra 1961
8	Gorica	4–0	Radnik Križevci

* Matches played on 31 October.
** Match played on 29 November.
*** Matches played on 5 December.

== Quarter-finals ==
The draw was held on 11 December 2023. The matches were scheduled for 28 February 2024.

Tie no.	Home team	Score	Away team
1^{*}	Hajduk Split	5–0	Varaždin
2	Dinamo Zagreb	4–0	Gorica
3^{*}	Lokomotiva	1–0	Osijek
4	Rudeš	0–1	Rijeka

* Matches played on 27 February.

== Semi-finals ==
The semi-finals were played on 3 April 2024, while the draw was held on 4 March 2024.

3 April 2024
16:00

Lokomotiva	0–1	Rijeka
	Report	Smolčić 70'

Stadion Kranjčevićeva, Zagreb
Attendance: 1,878
Referee: Patrik Kolarić (Čakovec)

3 April 2024
19:00

Hajduk Split	0–1	Dinamo Zagreb
	Report	Kulenović 15'

Stadion Poljud, Split
Attendance: 27,634
Referee: Fabio Maresca (Italy)

== Final ==
The first match of the final was played on 15 May 2024, and the second was played on 22 May 2024.

15 May 2024
19:00

Dinamo Zagreb	0–0	Rijeka
	Report

Stadion Maksimir, Zagreb
Attendance: 18,709
Referee: Dario Bel (Osijek)

22 May 2024
18:00

Rijeka	1–3	Dinamo Zagreb
Fruk 90+2'	Report	Sučić 28'; Baturina 42'; Bulat 82'

Stadion Rujevica, Rijeka
Attendance: 8,127
Referee: Jakov Titlić (Potravlje)

Dinamo Zagreb won 3–1 on aggregate

== Top scorers ==
Final ranking of top scorers.

Rank	Player	Club	Goals
1	(Croatia) Dražen Pilčić	Grobničan	10
2	(Germany) Törles Knöll	Vukovar 1991	4
2	(Croatia) Franjo Ivanović	Rijeka	4
2	(Croatia) Sandro Kulenović	Dinamo Zagreb	4
5	(Croatia) Filip Batarelo	Grobničan	3
5	(Croatia) Patrik Srzentić	Grobničan	3
5	(Switzerland) Josip Drmić	Dinamo Zagreb	3
8	26 players from 16 clubs		2
