= 2023–24 Second Football League (Croatia) =

Druga NL
- Season: 2023–24
- Dates: 18 August 2023 – 1 June 2024
- Champions: Opatija
- Promoted: Opatija
- Relegated: Krk; Belišće
- Matches: 240
- Goals: 681 (2.84 per match)
- Top goalscorer: Goodness Ajayi (16)
- All statistics correct as of 8 June 2024.

The 2023–24 Croatian Second Football League (also known as Druga nogometna liga and SuperSport Druga NL) was the 33rd edition of the third tier of Croatian football league and 2nd season of the restructured Druga nogometna liga.

The league was contested by 16 teams and played in a double round robin format.

== Teams ==
=== Stadium and Locations ===
| Team | Place | Stadium | Capacity |
|---|---|---|---|
| Belišće | Belišće | Stadion Gradski | 3,000 |
| Bjelovar | Bjelovar | Gradski stadion | 4,000 |
| Dugo Selo | Dugo Selo | Gradski stadion | 2,000 |
| Grobničan | Čavle | Stadion Adelija Haramija Beba | 3,000 |
| Hrvatski Dragovoljac | Zagreb | Stadion NŠC Stjepan Spajić | 5,000 |
| Hrvace | Hrvace | Gradski stadion | 2,000 |
| Jadran Luka Ploče | Ploče | Stadion Jadranovo | 2,000 |
| Jadran Poreč | Poreč | Stadion Veli Jože | 2,000 |
| Karlovac 1919 | Karlovac | Stadion Branko Čavlović-Čavlek | 12,000 |
| Krk | Krk | Stadion Kantrida | 10,600 |
| Kustošija | Zagreb | Stadion Kustošija | 2,550 |
| Marsonia 1909 | Slavonski Brod | Gradski stadion uz Savu | 6,000 |
| Mladost Ždralovi | Ždralovi | Stadion NK Mladost | 1,000 |
| Opatija | Opatija | Stadion Kantrida | 10,600 |
| Radnik Križevci | Križevci | Križevci City Stadium | 1,500 |
| Trnje | Zagreb | Stadion Trnje | 1,300 |

Locations of teams in 2023–24 Druga NL

| Rank | Counties of Croatia | Number of teams | Club(s) |
|---|---|---|---|
| 1 | Primorje-Gorski Kotar | 3 | Opatija, Grobničan, Krk |
| 1 | City of Zagreb | 3 | Hrvatski Dragovoljac, Trnje, Kustošija |
| 3 | Bjelovar-Bilogora | 2 | Bjelovar, Mladost |
| 4 | Brod-Posavina | 1 | Marsonia 1909 |
| 4 | Dubrovnik-Neretva | 1 | Jadran Luka Ploče |
| 4 | Istria | 1 | Jadran Poreč |
| 4 | Koprivnica-Križevci | 1 | Radnik Križevci |
| 4 | Osijek-Baranja | 1 | Belišće |
| 4 | Split-Dalmatia | 1 | Hrvace |
| 4 | Karlovac | 1 | Karlovac 1919 |
| 4 | Zagreb | 1 | Dugo Selo |

== League table ==
| Pos | Team | Pld | W | D | L | GF | GA | GD | Pts | Qualification or relegation |
|---|---|---|---|---|---|---|---|---|---|---|
| 1 | Opatija (C, P) | 30 | 20 | 4 | 6 | 48 | 21 | +27 | 64 | Promotion to the First Football League |
| 2 | Kustošija | 30 | 18 | 7 | 5 | 61 | 25 | +36 | 61 | Promotion play-off |
| 3 | Mladost Ždralovi | 30 | 18 | 6 | 6 | 55 | 23 | +32 | 60 | |
| 4 | Radnik Križevci | 30 | 18 | 4 | 8 | 51 | 30 | +21 | 58 | |
| 5 | Karlovac 1919 | 30 | 17 | 5 | 8 | 43 | 33 | +10 | 56 | |
| 6 | Jadran Luka Ploče | 30 | 12 | 11 | 7 | 42 | 28 | +14 | 47 | |
| 7 | Marsonia 1909 | 30 | 12 | 4 | 14 | 52 | 55 | −3 | 40 | |
| 8 | Bjelovar | 30 | 11 | 6 | 13 | 49 | 52 | −3 | 39 | |
| 9 | Dugo Selo | 30 | 9 | 10 | 11 | 39 | 37 | +2 | 37 | |
| 10 | Hrvatski Dragovoljac | 30 | 10 | 6 | 14 | 37 | 46 | −9 | 36 | |
| 11 | Hrvace | 30 | 11 | 3 | 16 | 46 | 60 | −14 | 36 | |
| 12 | Grobničan | 30 | 8 | 11 | 11 | 45 | 42 | +3 | 35 | |
| 13 | Trnje | 30 | 10 | 3 | 17 | 30 | 49 | −19 | 33 | |
| 14 | Jadran Poreč (Note: NK Jadran Poreč did not have to play relegation play-off because only 4 out of 5 winners from 3. NL were eligible for promotion.) | 30 | 6 | 10 | 14 | 36 | 58 | −22 | 28 | |
| 15 | Krk (R) | 30 | 5 | 9 | 16 | 26 | 46 | −20 | 24 | Relegation to the Third Football League |
| 16 | Belišće (R) | 30 | 2 | 7 | 21 | 21 | 76 | −55 | 13 | Relegation to the Third Football League |

Updated to match(es) played on 8 June 2024. Source: Druga-NL.com
Rules for classification: 1) Points; 2) Head-to-head points; 3) Head-to-head goal difference; 4) Head-to-head goals scored (at home if two teams tied); 5) Goal difference; 6) Goals scored; 7) Play-off
(Note: Criteria 2-4 and 7 is only used if deciding champion, teams for promotion or relegation and in that case criteria 6 will not be used).
(C) Champions; (P) Promoted; (R) Relegated

== Results ==
| Home \ Away | BEL | BJE | DSE | GRO | HRD | HRV | JLP | JPO | KAR | KRK | KUS | MAR | MLA | OPA | RAD | TRN |
|---|---|---|---|---|---|---|---|---|---|---|---|---|---|---|---|---|
| Belišće | — | 2–4 | 0–0 | 2–2 | 1–2 | 0–2 | 0–3 | 1–1 | 1–1 | 1–1 | 1–6 | 0–4 | 0–0 | 1–1 | 0–2 | 0–2 |
| Bjelovar | 4–1 | — | 1–5 | 3–0 | 3–2 | 2–3 | 2–1 | 1–1 | 2–0 | 4–0 | 0–2 | 2–2 | 2–2 | 0–2 | 3–2 | 1–0 |
| Dugo Selo | 5–2 | 2–0 | — | 0–0 | 4–0 | 2–2 | 0–0 | 1–1 | 0–1 | 0–0 | 0–1 | 0–3 | 1–2 | 0–1 | 2–2 | 2–0 |
| Grobničan | 5–0 | 3–3 | 2–2 | — | 3–1 | 4–0 | 0–0 | 1–1 | 0–1 | 1–1 | 5–3 | 4–2 | 2–1 | 1–1 | 2–0 | 3–0 |
| Hrvatski Dragovoljac | 3–2 | 3–2 | 0–2 | 2–0 | — | 3–0 | 0–0 | 1–1 | 2–0 | 1–1 | 0–4 | 1–2 | 2–1 | 0–0 | 0–2 | 2–1 |
| Hrvace | 6–0 | 2–1 | 2–1 | 2–2 | 0–4 | — | 2–0 | 4–3 | 0–1 | 3–1 | 0–4 | 2–1 | 1–2 | 2–1 | 0–2 | 0–4 |
| Jadran Luka Ploče | 2–0 | 1–0 | 2–1 | 0–0 | 2–1 | 3–2 | — | 3–0 | 3–1 | 1–1 | 3–1 | 2–3 | 0–0 | 2–3 | 1–2 | 1–1 |
| Jadran Poreč | 3–0 | 2–1 | 1–1 | 2–2 | 1–1 | 2–1 | 0–3 | — | 5–1 | 2–0 | 2–2 | 1–3 | 0–4 | 0–2 | 0–2 | 1–0 |
| Karlovac 1919 | 2–0 | 4–0 | 3–1 | 2–1 | 1–0 | 4–0 | 2–2 | 2–2 | — | 0–0 | 1–1 | 2–1 | 3–2 | 2–1 | 2–0 | 0–3 |
| Krk | 0–1 | 1–1 | 1–1 | 2–1 | 2–2 | 2–1 | 2–3 | 1–0 | 1–0 | — | 0–2 | 1–2 | 0–1 | 1–2 | 0–1 | 2–3 |
| Kustošija | 1–0 | 1–1 | 4–0 | 2–0 | 3–0 | 3–1 | 1–0 | 4–2 | 0–1 | 3–0 | — | 0–1 | 1–1 | 1–0 | 1–1 | 4–0 |
| Marsonia 1909 | 4–1 | 0–2 | 1–2 | 2–0 | 1–3 | 2–3 | 1–1 | 2–0 | 2–1 | 2–3 | 1–1 | — | 1–1 | 1–4 | 1–3 | 2–4 |
| Mladost Ždralovi | 2–1 | 4–1 | 3–1 | 3–0 | 2–0 | 1–0 | 1–0 | 5–0 | 2–3 | 2–0 | 0–0 | 4–1 | — | 3–1 | 3–0 | 3–0 |
| Opatija | 5–0 | 4–2 | 2–1 | 1–0 | 1–0 | 1–0 | 0–0 | 2–1 | 1–0 | 1–0 | 2–0 | 3–1 | 1–0 | — | 0–1 | 2–0 |
| Radnik Križevci | 3–0 | 2–1 | 0–1 | 2–1 | 1–0 | 3–3 | 0–2 | 5–0 | 0–1 | 2–1 | 1–2 | 4–1 | 1–1 | 1–0 | — | 4–1 |
| Trnje | 0–3 | 0–0 | 0–1 | 1–0 | 3–1 | 2–1 | 1–1 | 2–1 | 0–1 | 2–1 | 0–4 | 0–2 | 0–1 | 0–3 | 0–2 | — |

Updated to match(es) played on 8 June 2024. Source: Druga NL (in Croatian)
Legend: Blue = home team win; Yellow = draw; Red = away team win.
For upcoming matches, an "a" indicates there is an article about the rivalry between the two participants.

== Promotion play-offs ==
| Team 1 | Agg. | Team 2 | 1st leg | 2nd leg |
|---|---|---|---|---|
| Kustošija | 2–4 | Orijent | 1–2 | 1–2 |

== Statistics ==
=== Top scorers ===
As of 1 June 2024

| Rank | Player | Club | Goals |
|---|---|---|---|
| 1 | (Nigeria) Goodness Ajayi | Opatija | 16 |
| 2 | (Croatia) Luka Pisačić | Mladost Ždralovi | 15 |
| 2 | (Croatia) Dražen Pilčić | Grobničan | 15 |
| 4 | (Bosnia and Herzegovina) Selmir Mahmutović | Marsonia 1909 | 14 |
| 5 | (Bosnia and Herzegovina) Sedin Ljuca | Hrvace | 12 |
| 5 | (Croatia) Nino Stojanović | Bjelovar | 12 |
