= 2022–23 Croatian Football Cup =

SuperSport Hrvatski nogometni kup

Tournament details
- Country: Croatia
- Teams: 48

Final positions
- Champions: Hajduk Split
- Runners-up: Šibenik

Tournament statistics
- Matches played: 46
- Goals scored: 170 (3.7 per match)
- Top goal scorer: Josip Drmić (6)

The 2022–23 Croatian Football Cup was the 32nd season of Croatia's football knockout competition. It was sponsored by the betting company SuperSport and known as the SuperSport Hrvatski nogometni kup for sponsorship purposes. The defending champions were Hajduk Split, having won their seventh title the previous year by defeating their rivals Rijeka in the final. They successfully defended the title by defeating Šibenik 2–0 in the final, played at Stadion Rujevica.

For the first time ever, clubs in the competition were financially supported through television and sponsorship rights, with total fund of 1,225,000 kuna (€162,000).

== Calendar ==
Round	Date(s)	Number of fixtures	Clubs	New entries this round	Financial sponsorship	Goals / games
Preliminary round	31 August 2022	16	48 → 32	32	10,000 kn (home) / 7,500 kn (guest)	66 / 16
Round of 32	19 October 2022	16	32 → 16	16	15,000 kn (home)	63 / 15
Round of 16	9 November 2022	8	16 → 8	none	20,000 kn (home)	24 / 8
Quarter-finals	1 March 2023	4	8 → 4	none	30,000 kn (home)	11 / 4
Semi-finals	5 April 2023	2	4 → 2	none	50,000 kn (home) / 50,000 kn (guest)	4 / 2
Final	24 May 2023	1	2 → 1	none	150,000 kn (winner) / 75,000 kn (runner up)	2 / 1

== Participating clubs ==
The following 48 teams qualified for the competition:

Best clubs by cup coefficient 16 clubs	Winners and runners up of county cups 32 clubs
Rijeka; Dinamo Zagreb; Hajduk Split; Lokomotiva; Osijek; Istra 1961; Gorica; Slaven Belupo; Inter Zaprešić (dissolved at the start of the season); Šibenik; Rudeš; Varaždin; Jaska Vinogradar; Oriolik; Cibalia; RNK Split	Osijek-Baranja County cup winner: BSK Bijelo Brdo; Osijek-Baranja County cup runner up: Belišće; Zagreb County cup winner: Sava Strmec; Zagreb County cup runner up: Bistra; Brod-Posavina County cup winner: Slavonac Bukovlje; Brod-Posavina County cup runner up: Marsonia; Vukovar-Srijem County cup winner: Borinci; Vukovar-Srijem County cup runner up: Vuteks Sloga; Međimurje County cup winner: Nedelišće; Međimurje County cup runner up: Međimurje; Koprivnica-Križevci County cup winner: Tehničar Cvetkovec; Koprivnica-Križevci County cup runner up: Radnik Križevci; Istria County cup winner: Jadran Poreč; Istria County cup runner up: Funtana; Sisak-Moslavina County cup winner: Moslavina; Sisak-Moslavina County cup runner up: Mladost Petrinja; Virovitica-Podravina County cup winner: Virovitica; Virovitica-Podravina County cup runner up: Papuk; Varaždin County cup winner: Varteks; Varaždin County cup runner up: Bednja; Bjelovar-Bilogora County cup winner: Mladost Ždralovi; Bjelovar-Bilogora County cup runner up: Bjelovar; Split-Dalmatia County cup winner: Solin; City of Zagreb cup winner: Dubrava; Primorje-Gorski Kotar County cup winner: Grobničan; Požega-Slavonia County cup winner: BSK Buk; Zadar County cup winner: Primorac Biograd na Moru; Karlovac County cup winner: Karlovac 1919; Dubrovnik-Neretva County cup winner: Neretva; Krapina-Zagorje County cup winner: Gaj Mače; Šibenik-Knin County cup winner: Vodice; Lika-Senj County cup winner: Nehaj

== Preliminary round ==
The draw for the preliminary single-legged round was held on 19 July 2022 and the matches were played on 31 August 2022.

Tie no.	Home team	Score	Away team
1	Sava Strmec	4–6	Bednja
2	Moslavina	3–2	Međimurje
3	Solin	6–1	Funtana
4	Nehaj	0–4	Primorac Biograd na Moru
5	Neretva	0–2	Grobničan
6	BSK Bijelo Brdo	5–1	Marsonia
7	Radnik Križevci	1–3	Dubrava
8	Nedelišće	3–3 (5–4 p)	Varteks
9	Virovitica	0–6	Mladost Ždralovi
10	Tehničar Cvetkovec	4–0	Mladost Petrinja
11	Belišće	3–0	BSK Buk
12	Bjelovar	1–0 (a.e.t.)	Gaj Mače
13	Slavonac Bukovlje	0–2	Borinci
14	Papuk	0–0 (4–2 p)	Karlovac 1919
15	Vuteks Sloga	1–2	Jadran Poreč
16	Bistra	2–1	Vodice

== Round of 32 ==
The draw was determined according to the principle of opposite numbers, which were assigned based on the club coefficient. The matches were scheduled for 19 October 2022.

Tie no.	Home team	Score	Away team
1	Moslavina	1–1 (4–5 p)	Rijeka
2^{*}	Borinci	0–4	Dinamo Zagreb
3^{**}	Tehničar Cvetkovec	1–5	Hajduk Split
4	Bistra	1–6	Lokomotiva
5^{***}	Papuk	0–2	Osijek
6	Grobničan	1–2	Istra 1961
7^{***}	Dubrava	2–3	Gorica
8^{***}	Solin	1–2 (a.e.t.)	Slaven Belupo
9	Nedelišće	3–0 (w.o.)	Inter Zaprešić
10^{***}	Jadran Poreč	1–2	Šibenik
11	Bednja	0–3	Rudeš
12	Primorac Biograd na Moru	1–4 (a.e.t.)	Varaždin
13	Bjelovar	4–2 (a.e.t.)	Jaska Vinogradar
14^{***}	Mladost Ždralovi	6–0	Oriolik
15	RNK Split	2–0	Cibalia
16	Belišće	1–5	BSK Bijelo Brdo

* Match played on 27 September.
** Match played on 12 October.
*** Matches played on 18 October.

== Round of 16 ==
The draw was determined according to the principle of opposite numbers, which were assigned based on the tie number. The matches were scheduled for 9 November 2022.

Tie no.	Home team	Score	Away team
1	BSK Bijelo Brdo	2–1	Rijeka
2^{***}	RNK Split	1–3	Dinamo Zagreb
3^{**}	Mladost Ždralovi	0–2	Hajduk Split
4	Bjelovar	0–1	Lokomotiva
5	Varaždin	1–2	Osijek
6^{**}	Rudeš	2–1	Istra 1961
7	Šibenik	2–0	Gorica
8^{*}	Nedelišće	0–6	Slaven Belupo

* Match played on 2 November.
** Matches played on 8 November.
*** Match played on 14 February 2023.

== Quarter-finals ==
The quarter-finals were scheduled for 1 March 2023.

Tie no.	Home team	Score	Away team
1	Osijek	1–2	Hajduk Split
2	Dinamo Zagreb	3–1 (a.e.t.)	Lokomotiva
3^{*}	Slaven Belupo	2–0	Rudeš
4	BSK Bijelo Brdo	0–2	Šibenik

* Match played on 28 February.

== Semi-finals ==
The semi-finals were played on 5 and 12 April 2023, while the draw was held on 6 March 2023.

5 April 2023
17:30

Šibenik	2–1	Dinamo Zagreb
Pozo 72'; Čop 90+3'	Report	Drmić 1'

Stadion Šubićevac, Šibenik
Attendance: 2,261
Referee: Dario Bel (Osijek)

12 April 2023
17:30

Slaven Belupo	0–1	Hajduk Split
	Report	Livaja 59' (pen.)

Gradski stadion Ivan Kušek-Apaš, Koprivnica
Attendance: 3,000
Referee: Patrik Kolarić (Čakovec)

== Final ==
The final was played on 24 May 2023. On 27 February 2023, it was decided that Rijeka would host the final at Stadion Rujevica.

24 May 2023
19:00 CEST

Hajduk Split	2–0	Šibenik
Melnjak 64'; Livaja 90+4' (pen.)	Report

Stadion Rujevica, Rijeka
Attendance: 7,041
Referee: Igor Pajač (Sveti Ivan Zelina)

== Top scorers ==
Final ranking of top scorers.

Rank	Player	Club	Goals
1	(Switzerland) Josip Drmić	Dinamo Zagreb	6
2	(Croatia) Marko Guja	Mladost Ždralovi	4
3	(Croatia) Vice Birkić	Primorac Biograd na Moru	3
3	(Slovenia) Jan Mlakar	Hajduk Split	3
3	(Australia) Marc Tokich	BSK Bijelo Brdo	3
3	(Croatia) Sandro Kulenović	Lokomotiva	3
7	20 players from 14 clubs		2
