= 2023–24 First Football League (Croatia) =

Prva nogometna liga
- Season: 2023–24
- Dates: 11 August 2023 – 2 June 2024
- Champions: Šibenik
- Promoted: Šibenik
- Relegated: Solin
- Matches: 198
- Goals: 495 (2.5 per match)
- Top goalscorer: Dominik Dogan (23)
- All statistics correct as of 8 June 2024.

The 2023–24 First Football League (also known as Prva nogometna liga and 1. NL) was the 33rd season of the second-level football competition for men's association football teams in Croatia, since its establishment in 1992.

The league will be contested by 12 teams and played in a triple round robin format.

This is the second season that the second level of men's football in Croatia is named First football league (Prva nogometna liga).

== Teams ==
=== Changes ===
Rudeš was promoted to the 2023–24 HNL, while Hrvatski Dragovoljac and Kustošija were relegated to 2023–24 Druga NL.

Newcomer from higher level (HNL) is Šibenik. Newcomers from lower level (2. NL) are champions Sesvete and Zrinski Jurjevac, who beat Kustošija in play-offs.

=== Stadia and locations ===
Locations of teams in 2023–24 Prva NL

Team	City	Stadium	Capacity
BSK Bijelo Brdo	Bijelo Brdo	Stadion BSK	1,200
Cibalia	Vinkovci	Stadion Cibalia	9,958
Croatia Zmijavci	Zmijavci	Stadion Marijan Šuto Mrma	2,000
Dubrava	Zagreb	Stadion NŠC Stjepan Spajić	5,000
Dugopolje	Dugopolje	Stadion Hrvatski vitezovi	5,200
Jarun	Zagreb	Ivan Laljak-Ivić Stadium	5,228
Orijent	Rijeka	Stadion Krimeja	3,500
Sesvete	Sesvete	Stadion Sveti Josip radnik	2,000
Solin	Solin	Stadion Hrvatski vitezovi	5,200
Šibenik	Šibenik	Stadion Šubićevac	3,412
Vukovar 1991	Vukovar	Stadion u Borovu naselju	3,550
Zrinski Osječko 1664	Jurjevac Punitovački	Stadion Gradski vrt	17,061

Rank	Counties of Croatia	Number of teams	Club(s)
1	City of Zagreb	3	Dubrava, Jarun, Sesvete
1	Split-Dalmatia	3	Croatia Zmijavci, Dugopolje, Solin
3	Osijek-Baranja	2	BSK Bijelo Brdo, Zrinski Jurjevac
3	Vukovar-Syrmia	2	Cibalia, Vukovar 1991
5	Primorje-Gorski Kotar	1	Orijent
5	Šibenik-Knin	1	Šibenik

== League table ==
Pos	Team	Pld	W	D	L	GF	GA	GD	Pts	Qualification or relegation
1	Šibenik (C, P)	33	26	4	3	68	18	+50	82	Promotion to the Croatian Football League
2	Zrinski Osječko 1664	33	26	3	4	53	18	+35	81	
3	Vukovar 1991	33	16	10	7	56	36	+20	58	
4	Sesvete	33	12	6	15	36	41	−5	42	
5	Jarun	33	11	7	15	35	46	−11	40	
6	Dubrava	33	10	8	15	36	44	−8	38	
7	Dugopolje	33	8	13	12	38	45	−7	37	
8	Cibalia	33	11	4	18	37	57	−20	37	
9	Croatia Zmijavci	33	8	12	13	39	48	−9	36	
10	BSK Bijelo Brdo	33	7	13	13	30	44	−14	34	
11	Orijent	33	7	12	14	34	48	−14	33	Relegation play-off
12	Solin (R)	33	4	12	17	33	50	−17	24	Relegation to the Second Football League

Updated to match(es) played on 8 June 2024. Source: Prva NL
Rules for classification: 1) Points; 2) Head-to-head points; 3) Head-to-head goal difference; 4) Head-to-head goals scored (at home if two teams tied); 5) Goal difference; 6) Goals scored; 7) Play-off
(Note: Criteria 2-4 and 7 is only used if deciding champion, teams for promotion or relegation and in that case criteria 6 will not be used).
(C) Champions; (P) Promoted; (R) Relegated

== Results ==
Home \ Away	BSK	CIB	CRO	DUB	DUG	JAR	ORI	SES	SOL	ŠIB	VUK	ZRI
BSK Bijelo Brdo	—	2–2	0–0	1–1	1–1	0–0	2–2	2–0	1–1	0–1	1–3	0–1
Cibalia	0–1	—	1–0	1–0	2–1	3–1	1–0	0–1	3–1	1–3	0–1	1–4
Croatia Zmijavci	1–1	5–1	—	1–2	4–1	1–0	6–2	0–0	2–1	0–0	2–2	0–0
Dubrava	2–1	1–1	2–1	—	1–3	0–1	3–2	0–2	1–1	0–3	1–2	0–1
Dugopolje	1–1	4–0	1–1	1–2	—	4–0	1–2	1–1	1–1	0–0	1–2	0–0
Jarun	2–2	2–0	5–2	1–0	0–2	—	4–2	2–0	2–0	0–3	0–3	0–1
Orijent	1–0	0–3	1–1	1–1	1–2	0–1	—	1–0	1–1	5–4	0–1	0–1
Sesvete	2–0	4–0	1–0	0–1	0–1	2–1	1–1	—	2–0	1–0	1–2	0–1
Solin	0–0	0–3	0–0	3–1	0–0	1–1	4–1	0–1	—	2–3	1–1	1–2
Šibenik	3–0	2–0	2–1	4–1	1–1	2–0	1–0	3–0	1–0	—	3–0	3–0
Vukovar 1991	3–2	3–1	1–1	2–2	3–0	0–1	2–0	3–1	2–2	1–1	—	1–2
Zrinski Jurjevac	1–0	2–0	4–0	0–2	3–0	2–0	1–2	2–2	3–0	2–0	1–0	—

Source: Prva NL (in Croatian)
Legend: Blue = home team win; Yellow = draw; Red = away team win.
For upcoming matches, an "a" indicates there is an article about the rivalry between the two participants.

Home \ Away	BSK	CIB	CRO	DUB	DUG	JAR	ORI	SES	SOL	ŠIB	VUK	ZRI
BSK Bijelo Brdo	—	1–0	—	—	2–1	—	0–0	2–1	—	1–3	—	—
Cibalia	—	—	—	—	—	1–1	1–1	—	4–2	4–2	1–5	1–2
Croatia Zmijavci	3–0	2–0	—	—	0–2	—	—	3–1	—	0–3	—	—
Dubrava	4–0	1–2	1–1	—	—	—	0–1	—	3–0	0–4	—	—
Dugopolje	—	1–2	—	0–0	—	—	0–0	1–3	2–2	—	—	—
Jarun	1–3	—	1–1	0–1	1–2	—	—	—	—	—	2–2	1–2
Orijent	—	—	3–0	—	—	0–0	—	—	2–2	—	0–0	0–1
Sesvete	—	2–1	—	1–1	—	2–3	2–2	—	1–2	0–4	—	—
Solin	0–1	—	4–0	—	—	0–1	—	—	—	—	0–1	0–1
Šibenik	—	1–0	—	1–0	—	2–0	1–0	—	2–1	—	2–1	—
Vukovar 1991	2–2	—	2–0	3–1	1–1	—	—	0–1	—	—	—	1–2
Zrinski Jurjevac	1–0	—	3–0	2–0	4–1	—	—	1–0	—	0–2	—	—

Source: Prva NL (in Croatian)
Legend: Blue = home team win; Yellow = draw; Red = away team win.
For upcoming matches, an "a" indicates there is an article about the rivalry between the two participants.

== Relegation play-offs ==
Team 1	Agg.	Team 2	1st leg	2nd leg
Kustošija	2–4	Orijent	1–2	1–2

== Statistics ==
=== Top scorers ===
As of 2 June 2024

Rank	Player	Club	Goals
1	(Croatia) Dominik Dogan	Zrinski Osječko 1664	23
2	(Croatia) Josip Majić	Šibenik	14
3	(Croatia) Ivan Božić	Šibenik	13
4	(Croatia) Dragan Juranović	Dubrava	12
5	(Bosnia and Herzegovina) Zinedin Mustedanagić	Vukovar 1991	11

== Attendances ==
#	Club	Average
1	Zrinski	1,278
2	Šibenik	894
3	Orijent	569
4	Vukovar	459
5	Cibalia	397
6	Zmijavci	396
7	Bijelo Brdo	392
8	Dugopolje	303
9	Sesvete	301
10	Solin	250
11	Dubrava	204
12	Jarun	168
