= 2020–21 in Croatian football =

Football in Croatia
- Season: 2020–21

Men's football
- Prva HNL: Dinamo Zagreb
- Druga HNL: Hrvatski Dragovoljac
- Treća HNL: Mladost Ždralovi (North); Neretvanac (South); Crikvenica (West); Belišće (East); Jarun (Center)
- Croatian Cup: Dinamo Zagreb

Women's football
- Prva HNLŽ: Osijek
- Druga HNLŽ: Rijeka (Group A); Međimurje-Čakovec (Group B)
- Croatian Cup: Split

The following article presents a summary of the 2020–21 football season in Croatia, which is the 30th season of competitive football in the country.

== National teams ==
=== Croatia ===
Date	Venue	Opponents	Score	Croatia scorer(s)	Report
2020–21 UEFA Nations League – Group stage
5 September 2020	Estádio do Dragão, Porto	Portugal	1–4	Petković	UEFA.com
8 September 2020	Stade de France, Saint-Denis	France	2–4	Lovren, Brekalo	UEFA.com
11 October 2020	Stadion Maksimir, Zagreb	Sweden	2–1	Vlašić, Kramarić	UEFA.com
14 October 2020	Stadion Maksimir, Zagreb	France	1–2	Vlašić	UEFA.com
14 November 2020	Friends Arena, Solna	Sweden	1–2	Danielson (o.g.)	UEFA.com
17 November 2020	Stadion Poljud, Split	Portugal	2–3	Kovačić (2)	UEFA.com
2022 FIFA World Cup qualification – Group stage
24 March 2021	Stadion Stožice, Ljubljana	Slovenia	0–1		UEFA.com
27 March 2021	Stadion Rujevica, Rijeka	Cyprus	1–0	Pašalić	UEFA.com
30 March 2021	Stadion Rujevica, Rijeka	Malta	3–0	Perišić, Modrić, Brekalo	UEFA.com
Friendly fixtures
7 October 2020	Kybunpark, St. Gallen	Switzerland	2–1	Brekalo, Pašalić	UEFA.com
11 November 2020	Vodafone Park, Istanbul	Turkey	3–3	Budimir, Pašalić, Brekalo	UEFA.com
1 June 2021	Gradski stadion, Velika Gorica	Armenia	1–1	Perišić	UEFA.com
6 June 2021	King Baudouin Stadium, Brussels	Belgium	0–1		UEFA.com

=== Croatia U21 ===
Date	Venue	Opponents	Score	Croatia scorer(s)	Report
2021 UEFA European Under-21 Championship qualification - Group stage
3 September 2020	Stadion Varteks, Varaždin	Greece	5–0	Moro, Majer (2), Musa (2)	UEFA.com
7 September 2020	Stadion Střelecký ostrov, České Budějovice	Czech Republic	0–0		UEFA.com
8 October 2020	Stadion Kranjčevićeva, Zagreb	San Marino	10–0	Kulenović, Majer, Špikić, Ivanušec (3), Nejašmić (2), Vizinger, Gvardiol	UEFA.com
13 October 2020	Pampeloponnisiako Stadium, Patras	Greece	1–0	Majer	UEFA.com
12 November 2020	Tynecastle, Edinburgh	Scotland	2–2	Moro, Bistrović	UEFA.com
17 November 2020	Stadion Aldo Drosina, Pula	Lithuania	7–0	Špikić, Musa (2), Šverko, Šutalo, Moro (2)	UEFA.com
2021 UEFA European Under-21 Championship - Group stage
25 March 2021	Bonifika Stadium, Koper	Portugal	0–1		UEFA.com
28 March 2021	Bonifika Stadium, Koper	Switzerland	3–2	Ivanušec, Moro, Vizinger	UEFA.com
31 March 2021	Bonifika Stadium, Koper	England	1–2	Bradarić	UEFA.com
2021 UEFA European Under-21 Championship - Knockout stage
31 May 2021	Ljudski vrt, Maribor	Spain	1–2 (a.e.t.)	Ivanušec	UEFA.com

=== Croatia U19 ===
Date	Venue	Opponents	Score	Croatia scorer(s)	Report
2021 UEFA European Under-19 Championship qualification - Qualifying round
24 March 2021	Stadion Branko Čavlović-Čavlek, Karlovac	Kazakhstan	Cancelled		UEFA.com
27 March 2021	Stadion Branko Čavlović-Čavlek, Karlovac	Latvia	Cancelled		UEFA.com
30 March 2021	Stadion Branko Čavlović-Čavlek, Karlovac	Georgia	Cancelled		UEFA.com

=== Croatia U17 ===
Date	Venue	Opponents	Score	Croatia scorer(s)	Report
2021 UEFA European Under-17 Championship qualification - Qualifying round
March 2021		Bulgaria	Cancelled		UEFA.com
March 2021		Liechtenstein	Cancelled		UEFA.com
March 2021		Bosnia and Herzegovina	Cancelled		UEFA.com

=== Croatia Women's ===
Date	Venue	Opponents	Score	Croatia scorer(s)	Report
UEFA Women's Euro 2022 qualifying - Group stage
18 September 2020	Stadion ŠRC Zaprešić, Zaprešić	Switzerland	1–1	Rudelić	UEFA.com
22 September 2020	Stadionul Mogoșoaia, Mogoșoaia	Romania	1–4	Rudelić	UEFA.com
27 November 2020	Stadion Aldo Drosina, Pula	Lithuania	1–0	Šundov	UEFA.com
23 February 2021	Stadion Aldo Drosina, Pula	Romania	0–1		UEFA.com

=== Croatia Women's U19 ===
Date	Venue	Opponents	Score	Croatia scorer(s)	Report
2021 UEFA Women's Under-19 Championship qualification - Qualifying round
April 2021		Austria	Cancelled		UEFA.com
April 2021		Germany	Cancelled		UEFA.com
April 2021		Kazakhstan	Cancelled		UEFA.com

=== Croatia Women's U17 ===
Date	Venue	Opponents	Score	Croatia scorer(s)	Report
2021 UEFA Women's Under-17 Championship qualification - Qualifying round
9 February 2021		Serbia	Cancelled		UEFA.com
12 February 2021		Poland	Cancelled		UEFA.com
15 February 2021		Montenegro	Cancelled		UEFA.com

== League tables ==
=== Croatian First Football League ===
Pos	Team	Pld	W	D	L	GF	GA	GD	Pts	Qualification or relegation
1	Dinamo Zagreb (C)	36	26	7	3	84	28	+56	85	Qualification for the Champions League first qualifying round
2	Osijek	36	23	8	5	59	25	+34	77	Qualification for the Europa Conference League second qualifying round
3	Rijeka	36	18	7	11	51	46	+5	61	Qualification for the Europa Conference League second qualifying round
4	Hajduk Split	36	18	6	12	48	37	+11	60	Qualification for the Europa Conference League second qualifying round
5	Gorica	36	17	8	11	60	47	+13	59	
6	Šibenik	36	9	8	19	32	47	−15	35	
7	Slaven Belupo	36	7	13	16	36	53	−17	34	
8	Lokomotiva	36	7	9	20	29	60	−31	30	
9	Istra 1961	36	7	8	21	27	52	−25	29	
10	Varaždin (R)	36	6	10	20	30	61	−31	28	Relegation for the Croatian Second Football League

Source: PrvaHNL.hr
Rules for classification: 1) Points; 2) Head-to-head points; 3) Head-to-head goal difference; 4) Head-to-head goals scored (at home if two teams tied); 5) Goal difference; 6) Goals scored; 7) Play-off
(Note: Criteria 2-4 and 7 is only used if deciding champion, teams to international competition or teams for relegation and in that case criteria 6 will not be used).
(C) Champions; (R) Relegated

=== Croatian Second Football League ===
Pos	Team	Pld	W	D	L	GF	GA	GD	Pts	Qualification or relegation (Note: Dinamo Zagreb II, Hajduk Split II and Osijek II are ineligible for promotion)
1	Hrvatski Dragovoljac (C, P)	34	16	11	7	49	39	+10	59	Promotion to the Croatian First Football League
2	Rudeš	34	15	12	7	52	41	+11	57	
3	BSK Bijelo Brdo	34	14	13	7	52	40	+12	55	
4	Cibalia	34	15	6	13	50	43	+7	51	
5	Kustošija	34	12	15	7	43	38	+5	51	
6	Sesvete	34	15	6	13	62	59	+3	51	
7	Opatija	34	12	14	8	42	41	+1	50	
8	Dugopolje	34	13	9	12	49	45	+4	48	
9	Dubrava	34	13	7	14	45	46	−1	46	
10	Inter Zaprešić	34	12	9	13	49	41	+8	45	
11	Orijent 1919	34	12	9	13	52	49	+3	45	
12	Croatia Zmijavci	34	13	5	16	52	53	−1	44	
13	Dinamo Zagreb II	34	12	7	15	45	41	+4	43	
14	Osijek II	34	11	9	14	42	42	0	42	
15	Hajduk Split II (D)	34	11	8	15	58	60	−2	41	Dissolved at the end of the season
16	Solin	34	10	8	16	45	56	−11	38	
17	Junak Sinj (R)	34	7	13	14	46	58	−12	34	Relegation to the Croatian Third Football League
18	Međimurje (R)	34	9	7	18	44	85	−41	34	Relegation to the Croatian Third Football League

Updated to match(es) played on 29 May 2021. Source: Druga-HNL.com
Rules for classification: 1) Points; 2) Head-to-head points; 3) Head-to-head goal difference; 4) Head-to-head goals scored (at home if two teams tied); 5) Goal difference; 6) Goals scored; 7) Play-off
(Note: Criteria 2-4 and 7 is only used if deciding champion, teams for promotion or relegation and in that case criteria 6 will not be used).
(C) Champions; (D) Dissolved; (P) Promoted; (R) Relegated

== Croatian clubs in Europe ==
=== Summary ===
Club	Competition	Starting round	Final round	Matches played
Dinamo Zagreb	Champions League	2nd qualifying round	3rd qualifying round	2
Dinamo Zagreb	Europa League	Play-off round	Quarter-finals	13
Lokomotiva	Champions League	2nd qualifying round		1
Lokomotiva	Europa League	3rd qualifying round		1
Rijeka	Europa League	3rd qualifying round	Group stage	8
Osijek	Europa League	2nd qualifying round		1
Hajduk Split	Europa League	2nd qualifying round	3rd qualifying round	2
ŽNK Split	Women's Champions League	1st qualifying round		1
Dinamo Zagreb U19	UEFA Youth League	First round		0

=== Dinamo Zagreb ===
Date	Venue	Opponents	Score	Dinamo Zagreb scorer(s)	Report
2020–21 Champions League - Second qualifying round
26 August 2020	Stadionul Dr. Constantin Rădulescu, Cluj	(Romania) CFR Cluj	2–2 (6–5 p)	Gojak, Kastrati	UEFA.com
2020–21 Champions League - Third qualifying round
16 September 2020	Groupama Arena, Budapest	(Hungary) Ferencváros	1–2	Uzuni (o.g.)	UEFA.com
2020–21 Europa League - Play-off round
1 October 2020	Stadion Maksimir, Zagreb	(Estonia) Flora	3–1	Gavranović, Ademi (2)	UEFA.com
2020–21 Europa League - Group stage
22 October 2020	Stadion Maksimir, Zagreb	(Netherlands) Feyenoord	0–0		UEFA.com
29 October 2020	VEB Arena, Moscow	(Russia) CSKA Moscow	0–0		UEFA.com
5 November 2020	Stadion Maksimir, Zagreb	(Austria) Wolfsberger AC	1–0	Atiemwen	UEFA.com
26 November 2020	Wörthersee Stadion, Klagenfurt	(Austria) Wolfsberger AC	3–0	Majer, Petković, Ivanušec	UEFA.com
3 December 2020	De Kuip, Rotterdam	(Netherlands) Feyenoord	2–0	Petković, Majer	UEFA.com
10 December 2020	Stadion Maksimir, Zagreb	(Russia) CSKA Moscow	3–1	Gvardiol, Oršić, Kastrati	UEFA.com
2020–21 Europa League - Round of 32
18 February 2021	Krasnodar Stadium, Krasnodar	(Russia) Krasnodar	3–2	Petković (2), Atiemwen	UEFA.com
25 February 2021	Stadion Maksimir, Zagreb	(Russia) Krasnodar	1–0	Oršić	UEFA.com
2020–21 Europa League - Round of 16
11 March 2021	Tottenham Hotspur Stadium, London	(England) Tottenham Hotspur	0–2		UEFA.com
18 March 2021	Stadion Maksimir, Zagreb	(England) Tottenham Hotspur	3–0 (a.e.t.)	Oršić (3)	UEFA.com
2020–21 Europa League - Quarter-finals
8 April 2021	Stadion Maksimir, Zagreb	(Spain) Villarreal	0–1		UEFA.com
15 April 2021	Estadio de la Cerámica, Villarreal	(Spain) Villarreal	1–2	Oršić	UEFA.com

=== Lokomotiva ===
Date	Venue	Opponents	Score	Lokomotiva scorer(s)	Report
2020–21 Champions League - Second qualifying round
26 August 2020	Stadion Kranjčevićeva, Zagreb	(Austria) Rapid Wien	0–1		UEFA.com
2020–21 Europa League - Third qualifying round
24 September 2020	Stadion, Malmö	(Sweden) Malmö	0–5		UEFA.com

=== Rijeka ===
Date	Venue	Opponents	Score	Rijeka scorer(s)	Report
2020–21 Europa League - Third qualifying round
24 September 2020	Stadion Rujevica, Rijeka	(Ukraine) Kolos Kovalivka	2–0 (a.e.t.)	Escoval, Andrijašević	UEFA.com
2020–21 Europa League - Play-off round
1 October 2020	Parken Stadium, Copenhagen	(Denmark) Copenhagen	1–0	Ankersen (o.g.)	UEFA.com
2020–21 Europa League - Group stage
22 October 2020	Stadion Rujevica, Rijeka	(Spain) Real Sociedad	0–1		UEFA.com
29 October 2020	AFAS Stadion, Alkmaar	(Netherlands) AZ	1–4	Kulenović	UEFA.com
5 November 2020	Stadion Rujevica, Rijeka	(Italy) Napoli	1–2	Murić	UEFA.com
26 November 2020	Stadio San Paolo, Naples	(Italy) Napoli	0–2		UEFA.com
3 December 2020	Anoeta Stadium, San Sebastián	(Spain) Real Sociedad	2–2	Velkovski, Lončar	UEFA.com
10 December 2020	Stadion Rujevica, Rijeka	(Netherlands) AZ	2–1	Menalo, Tomečak	UEFA.com

=== Osijek ===
Date	Venue	Opponents	Score	Osijek scorer(s)	Report
2020–21 Europa League - Second qualifying round
17 September 2020	Stadion Gradski vrt, Osijek	(Switzerland) Basel	1–2	Majstorović	UEFA.com

=== Hajduk Split ===
Date	Venue	Opponents	Score	Hajduk Split scorer(s)	Report
2020–21 Europa League - Second qualifying round
17 September 2020	Ecolog Arena, Tetovo	(North Macedonia) Renova	1–0	Caktaš	UEFA.com
2020–21 Europa League - Third qualifying round
24 September 2020	Türk Telekom Stadium, Istanbul	(Turkey) Galatasaray	0–2		UEFA.com

=== ŽNK Split ===
Date	Venue	Opponents	Score	ŽNK Split scorer(s)	Report
2020–21 UEFA Women's Champions League - First qualifying round
4 November 2020	Stadion Górnika Łęczna, Łęczna	(Poland) Górnik Łęczna	1–4	Medić	UEFA.com

=== Dinamo Zagreb U19 ===
Date	Venue	Opponents	Score	Dinamo Zagreb U19 scorer(s)	Report
2018–19 UEFA Youth League Domestic Champions Path - First round
3 March 2021	Stadion Hitrec-Kacian, Zagreb	(Norway) Rosenborg	Cancelled		UEFA.com
