= HNK Vukovar 1991 =

Croatian football club

Vukovar 1991
- Full name: Hrvatski nogometni klub Vukovar 1991
- Founded: February 2012; 14 years ago
- Ground: Stadion Borovo naselje, Stadion Gradski vrt (temporary)
- Capacity: 6,000
- Chairman: Markus Buzov
- Manager: Kristijan Polovanec
- League: Prva NL
- 2025–26: Croatian Football League, 10th of 10 (relegated)
- Website: hnk-vukovar1991.hr
Home colours	Away colours	Third colours

HNK Vukovar 1991 is a professional Croatian football club based in Vukovar. The club currently plays in the First Football League, the second tier of Croatian football, following relegation from the 2025–26 Croatian Football League.

== History ==
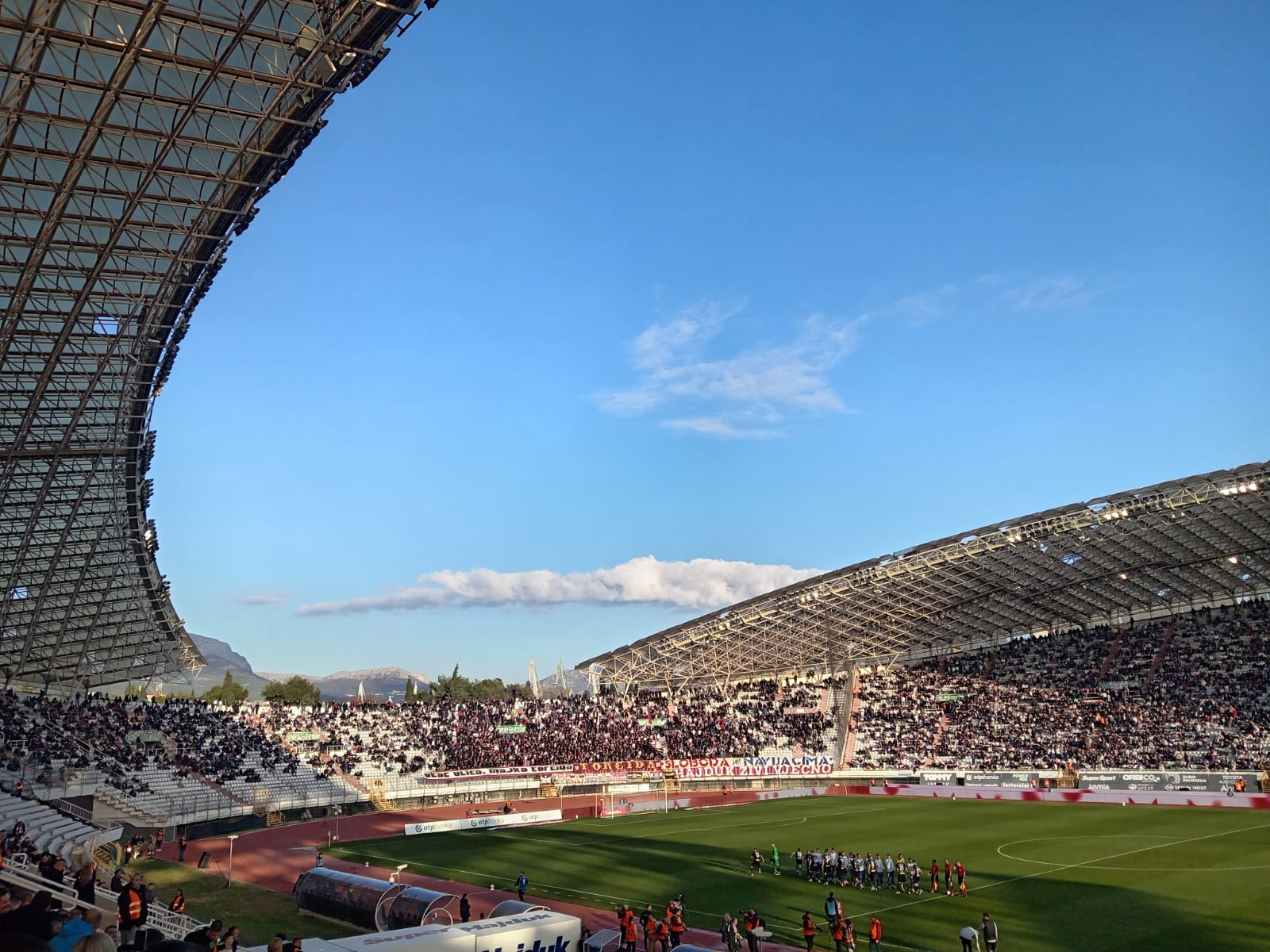
Stadion Poljud in Split ahead of the penultimate match of the autumn part of the 2025–26 season of the Croatian Football League between HNK Hajduk Split and HNK Vukovar 1991 played on 21 December 2025.

The club was founded on the same day in early February 2012 when the old club Vukovar '91, who played a single season in Croatia's top division, was dissolved due to bankruptcy.

The club's first season in the Croatian fourth tier was successful, as they got promoted to the 3. HNL. In their 2021–22 season campaign, they were champions of the East region of the 3. HNL and beat NK Mladost Ždralovi in the promotion-playoff final in order to be promoted to the Prva liga.

In the 2024–25 season, the club were champions of the Croatian First Football League and gained promotion to SuperSport HNL, the top tier of Croatian football for the first time in club history, and after 25 years including the original Vukovar '91 club. Due to the club's stadium not meeting requirements of the first tier of Croatian football, they play their home matches at Stadion HNK Cibalia in the nearby town of Vinkovci.

== Recent seasons ==
Season	Division	P	W	D	L	F	A	Pts	Pos	Cup	Player	Goals
Season	League									Cup	Top goalscorer	
2012-13	MŽNL Osijek-Vinkovci	32	21	1	9	69	42	65	2nd ↑			
2013-14	3. HNL East	29	13	2	4	52	49	41	8th			
2014-15	3. HNL East	30	11	8	11	50	47	41	10th			
2015-16	3. HNL East	30	13	3	4	48	50	42	9th			
2016-17	3. HNL East	30	10	5	15	38	51	35	12th	R1		
2017-18	3. HNL East	30	6	13	11	31	45	31	12th			
2018-19	3. HNL East	30	8	7	15	29	52	31	14th	R1		
2019-20	3. HNL East	17	1	5	11	10	31	8	15th		Three players	2
2020-21	3. HNL East	34	23	6	5	68	12	75	2nd		Josip Barišić	20
2021-22	3. HNL East	34	25	7	2	80	20	82	1st ↑		Josip Barišić	12
2022-23	1. NL	33	17	12	4	57	25	63	2nd		Zinedin Mustedanagić, Vanja Pelko	11
2023-24	1. NL	33	16	10	7	56	36	58	3rd	R2	Törles Knöll, Zinedin Mustedanagić	11
2024-25	1. NL	33	21	9	3	55	14	72	1st ↑		Vanja Pelko	8
2025-26	HNL	36	6	10	20	37	73	28	10th ↓	R1	Jakov Puljić	17

== Current squad ==
As of 21 November 2026

Note: Flags indicate national team as defined under FIFA eligibility rules; some limited exceptions apply. Players may hold more than one non-FIFA nationality.

No.	Pos.	Nation	Player
1	GK	CRO	Adrian Hrvojević (on loan from Hajduk Split)
2	DF	GER	Leonard Brodersen
3	DF	CRO	Niko Beroš
4	DF	CRO	Dominik Pavlek
5	DF	CRO	Krešimir Vrbanac (on loan from Osijek)
6	MF	CRO	Domagoj Stranput
7	MF	PHI	Pocholo Bugas
8	MF	POR	Ugosinho
9	FW	CRO	Fran Petković
10	MF	COL	Robin González
11	MF	GER	Sejoba Barnes
12	GK	CRO	Dominik Damjanović
14	MF	CRO	Fran Majdenić
15	MF	CRO	Nikola Zlatunić

No.	Pos.	Nation	Player
16	DF	CRO	Kristijan Pavičić
17	MF	CRO	Patrik Jerković
18	FW	CRO	Niko Pajvančić (captain)
19	DF	CRO	Borna Požega
20	MF	POR	Samuel Dias Semedo
21	DF	ARG	Gonzalo Pineda
22	DF	CRO	Noa Grubišić
23	FW	CRO	Daniel Vinković
24	FW	CRO	Ante Kramarić
25	FW	BRA	Raí
27	MF	CRO	Luka Barić
30	FW	CRO	Dino Jergović
31	GK	CRO	Ivano Francešević

== Personnel ==
Position	Staff
Sporting director	(Croatia) Dražen Pernar
Head coach	(Croatia) Kristijan Polovanec
Assistant coach	(Croatia) Josip Barišić (Croatia) Ante Stipić
Goalkeeping coach	(Croatia) Marijan Antolović
Fitness coach	(Croatia) Luka Hoti
Team manager	(Croatia) Romeo Šapina
Physiotherapist	(Croatia) Ivica Oršolić (Croatia) Damjan Čulinović

Last updated: 9 January 2026
Source: HNK Vukovar 1991 official website
