= NK Slavija =

NK Slavija may refer to:

- NK Slavija Pleternica, football club from Pleternica, Croatia
- NK Slavija Vevče, football club from Ljubljana, Slovenia
