= Kebba Kebell Suso =

Gambian footballer

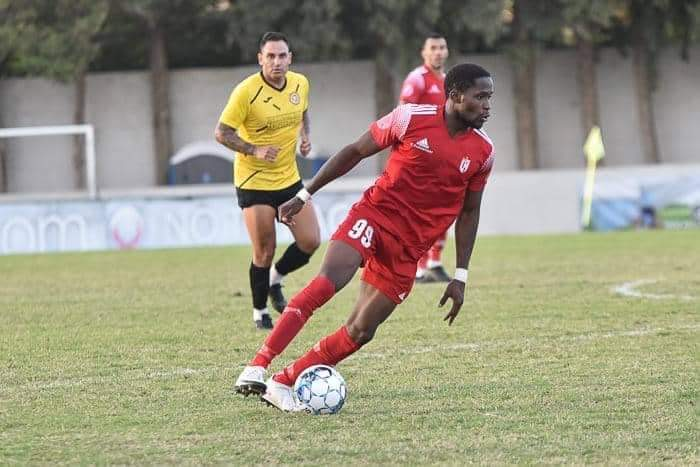

Personal information
- Date of birth: 3 September 1997 (age 29)
- Place of birth: Bansang, Gambia
- Height: 1.82 m (6 ft 0 in)
- Position: Forward

Team information
- Current team: Zrinjski Osječko
- Number: 9

Senior career*
Years	Team	Apps	(Gls)
–2021	Hawks FC	17	(9)
2021–2022	Victoria Hotspurs	13	(6)
2022–2023	Attard	19	(5)
2023	Syrianska Eskilstuna IF		
2023–2024	Dekani	12	(7)
2024	Vardar Skopje	13	(0)
2024–2025	Burgan SC		
2025–	Zrinjski Osječko	1	(0)
- * Club domestic league appearances and goals as of 28 February 2025

Kebba Kebell Suso (born 3 September 1997) is a Gambian professional footballer who plays as a forward for Zrinjski Osječko.

== Club career ==
Kebell Suso played with Gambian local top-league side Hawks FC until he signed with Maltese club Victoria Hotspurs in summer 2021.

In February 2025, Kebell Suso transferred from the Kuwaiti Division One team Burgan SC to the Croatian First Football League team Zrinski Osječko 1664, signing a contract until the end of the season.
