= 2021–22 Croatian Third Football League =

2021–22 Croatian Third Football League, also known as 3. HNL 2021–2022, was the 31st edition of the third tier of Croatian football league and the last at that level.

== East ==
Pos	Team	Pld	W	D	L	GF	GA	GD	Pts	Qualification or relegation
1	HNK Vukovar '91 (C, O, P)	34	25	7	2	80	20	+60	82	Play-off for promotion to 2022–23 Prva NL
2	Zrinski Jurjevac	34	24	6	4	69	33	+36	78	
3	NK Belišće	34	23	6	5	95	28	+67	75	
4	NK Marsonia 1909 (O)	34	21	7	6	61	25	+36	70	Relegation play-off
5	NK Slavonija Požega (R)	34	18	7	9	60	38	+22	61	Relegation to Treća NL
6	HNK Đakovo Croatia (R)	34	16	11	7	60	38	+22	59	Relegation to Treća NL
7	Bedem Ivankovo (R)	34	13	8	13	53	52	+1	47	Relegation to Treća NL
8	Slavija Pleternica (R)	34	13	6	15	57	68	−11	45	Relegation to Treća NL
9	Kutjevo (R)	34	12	7	15	59	62	−3	43	Relegation to Treća NL
10	NK Graničar Županja (R)	34	11	7	16	43	52	−9	40	Relegation to Treća NL
11	Sloga Nova Gradiška (R)	34	12	3	19	46	71	−25	39	Relegation to Treća NL
12	Oriolik Oriovac (R)	34	11	5	18	43	71	−28	38	Relegation to Treća NL
13	Čepin (R)	34	8	10	16	46	64	−18	34	Relegation to Treća NL
14	Darda (R)	34	9	5	20	44	71	−27	32	Relegation to Treća NL
15	Vuteks Sloga (R)	34	9	4	21	52	81	−29	31	Relegation to Treća NL
16	NAŠK Našice (R)	34	7	9	18	38	63	−25	30	Relegation to Treća NL
17	Omladinac Gornja Vrba (R)	34	8	6	20	35	63	−28	30	Relegation to Treća NL
18	Slavonac Bukovlje (R)	34	7	4	23	36	77	−41	25	Relegation to inter-county leagues

Updated to match(es) played on 28 May 2022. Source:
Rules for classification: 1) Points, 2) Head-to-head points, 3) Head-to-head goal difference, 4) Goal difference, 5) Matches won, 6) Goals scored
(C) Champions; (O) Play-off winners; (P) Promoted; (R) Relegated

== North ==
=== First phase ===
Pos	Team	Pld	W	D	L	GF	GA	GD	Pts	Qualification or relegation
1	Polet (SMnM)	22	17	0	5	61	17	+44	51	Advance to the Promotion Group
2	Mladost Ždralovi	22	15	5	2	45	15	+30	50	Advance to the Promotion Group
3	Nogometni klub Bjelovar	22	14	3	5	53	26	+27	45	Advance to the Promotion Group
4	Križevci	22	14	2	6	57	25	+32	44	Advance to the Promotion Group
5	NK Međimurje	22	12	3	7	40	33	+7	39	Advance to the Promotion Group
6	Podravina Ludbreg	22	8	7	7	35	41	−6	31	Advance to the Promotion Group
7	Papuk Orahovica	22	7	4	11	32	43	−11	25	Qualification to the Relegation Round
8	NK Varteks (2011)	22	6	4	12	20	39	−19	22	Qualification to the Relegation Round
9	NK Koprivnica	22	3	8	11	24	43	−19	17	Qualification to the Relegation Round
10	Virovitica	22	5	2	15	25	52	−27	17	Qualification to the Relegation Round
11	Podravac Virje	22	4	4	14	23	50	−27	16	Qualification to the Relegation Round
12	Rudar Mursko Središće	22	4	4	14	25	56	−31	16	Qualification to the Relegation Round

Updated to match(es) played on 28 May 2022. Source:
Rules for classification: 1) Points, 2) Head-to-head points, 3) Head-to-head goal difference, 4) Goal difference, 5) Matches won, 6) Goals scored

=== Second phase ===
==== Promotion group ====
Pos	Team	Pld	W	D	L	GF	GA	GD	Pts	Qualification or relegation
1	Polet (SMnM) (R)	27	21	0	6	75	22	+53	63	Relegation to Treća NL
2	Mladost Ždralovi	27	19	5	3	54	18	+36	62	Play-off for promotion to 2022–23 Prva NL
3	Nogometni klub Bjelovar	27	18	3	6	68	33	+35	57	
4	Križevci (R)	27	16	2	9	69	35	+34	50	Relegation to Treća NL
5	NK Međimurje (O)	27	13	3	11	45	47	−2	42	Relegation play-off
6	Podravina Ludbreg (R)	27	8	7	12	39	61	−22	31	Relegation to Treća NL

Updated to match(es) played on 28 May 2022. Source:
Rules for classification: 1) Points, 2) Head-to-head points, 3) Head-to-head goal difference, 4) Goal difference, 5) Matches won, 6) Goals scored
(O) Play-off winners; (R) Relegated

==== Relegation group ====
Pos	Team	Pld	W	D	L	GF	GA	GD	Pts	Relegation
1	NK Koprivnica (R)	27	7	9	11	40	51	−11	30	Relegation to Treća NL
2	Papuk Orahovica (R)	27	8	5	14	36	54	−18	29	Relegation to Treća NL
3	NK Varteks (2011) (R)	27	7	5	15	32	52	−20	26	Relegation to Treća NL
4	Rudar Mursko Središće (R)	27	6	6	15	36	64	−28	24	Relegation to Treća NL
5	Podravac Virje (R)	27	6	5	16	31	58	−27	23	Relegation to Treća NL
6	Virovitica (R)	27	6	4	17	32	62	−30	22	Relegation to inter-county leagues

Updated to match(es) played on 28 May 2022. Source:
Rules for classification: 1) Points, 2) Head-to-head points, 3) Head-to-head goal difference, 4) Goal difference, 5) Matches won, 6) Goals scored
(R) Relegated

== South ==
Pos	Team	Pld	W	D	L	GF	GA	GD	Pts	Qualification or relegation
1	Jadran Ploče (C)	34	20	5	9	67	28	+39	65	
2	Hrvatski vitez Posedarje (R)	34	18	6	10	56	38	+18	60	Relegation play-off
3	Hrvace	34	18	6	10	46	39	+7	60	Play-off for promotion to 2022–23 Prva NL
4	HNK Zadar (R)	34	16	11	7	69	28	+41	59	Relegation to Treća NL
5	NK Neretva (R)	34	16	7	11	50	36	+14	55	Relegation to Treća NL
6	RNK Split (R)	34	15	7	12	52	40	+12	52	Relegation to Treća NL
7	NK Junak Sinj (R)	34	16	4	14	49	46	+3	52	Relegation to Treća NL
8	NK Uskok (R)	34	15	6	13	51	54	−3	51	Relegation to Treća NL
9	Sloga Mravince (R)	34	12	14	8	48	45	+3	50	Relegation to Treća NL
10	Primorac Biograd (R)	34	14	6	14	60	56	+4	48	Relegation to Treća NL
11	Zagora Unešić (R)	34	12	8	14	47	52	−5	44	Relegation to Treća NL
12	NK GOŠK Dubrovnik (R)	34	11	10	13	35	34	+1	43	Relegation to Treća NL
13	HNK Zmaj Makarska (R)	34	11	10	13	28	39	−11	43	Relegation to Treća NL
14	NK Neretvanac Opuzen (R)	34	10	8	16	40	53	−13	38	Relegation to Treća NL
15	Kamen Ivanbegovina (R)	34	9	10	15	37	51	−14	37	Relegation to Treća NL
16	Vodice (R)	34	8	9	17	44	73	−29	33	Relegation to Treća NL
17	Urania Baška Voda (R)	34	10	3	21	33	65	−32	33	Relegation to Treća NL
18	OSK Otok (R)	34	6	8	20	48	83	−35	26	Relegation to inter-county leagues

Updated to match(es) played on 28 May 2022. Source:
Rules for classification: 1) Points, 2) Head-to-head points, 3) Head-to-head goal difference, 4) Goal difference, 5) Matches won, 6) Goals scored
(C) Champions; (R) Relegated

== Center ==
Pos	Team	Pld	W	D	L	GF	GA	GD	Pts	Qualification or relegation
1	NK Zagorec Krapina (C)	34	24	6	4	82	38	+44	78	Play-off for promotion to 2022–23 Prva NL
2	Dugo Selo	34	20	8	6	61	31	+30	68	
3	Trnje Zagreb (R)	34	18	9	7	64	43	+21	63	Relegation play-off
4	NK Karlovac	34	17	11	6	68	24	+44	62	Relegation to Treća NL
5	NK Lučko (R)	34	18	7	9	65	36	+29	61	Relegation to Treća NL
6	NK Maksimir (R)	34	17	6	11	55	40	+15	57	Relegation to Treća NL
7	NK Vrbovec (R)	34	14	7	13	56	59	−3	49	Relegation to Treća NL
8	Ravnice Zagreb (R)	34	11	14	9	37	42	−5	47	Relegation to Treća NL
9	Gaj Mače (R)	34	13	7	14	53	51	+2	46	Relegation to Treća NL
10	HAŠK (R)	34	11	12	11	46	45	+1	45	Relegation to Treća NL
11	Vrapče Zagreb (R)	34	11	10	13	56	48	+8	43	Relegation to Treća NL
12	NK Bistra (R)	34	10	11	13	53	56	−3	41	Relegation to Treća NL
13	Kurilovec (R)	34	8	12	14	39	44	−5	36	Relegation to Treća NL
14	Lukavec (R)	34	8	9	17	37	69	−32	33	Relegation to Treća NL
15	NK Trešnjevka (R)	34	7	8	19	53	78	−25	29	Relegation to Treća NL
16	NK Ponikve (R)	34	7	7	20	32	53	−21	28	Relegation to Treća NL
17	HNK Segesta (R)	34	6	8	20	33	76	−43	26	Relegation to Treća NL
18	Mladost Petrinja (R)	34	5	10	19	32	89	−57	25	Relegation to inter-county leagues

Updated to match(es) played on unknown. Source:
Rules for classification: 1) Points, 2) Head-to-head points, 3) Head-to-head goal difference, 4) Goal difference, 5) Matches won, 6) Goals scored
(C) Champions; (R) Relegated

== West ==
Pos	Team	Pld	W	D	L	GF	GA	GD	Pts	Qualification or relegation
1	Crikvenica (C, R)	26	18	2	6	53	24	+29	56	Relegation to Treća NL
2	Grobničan	26	16	7	3	66	23	+43	55	Play-off for promotion to 2022–23 Prva NL
3	Jadran Poreč	26	16	6	4	59	22	+37	54	
4	Pazinka (R)	26	12	5	9	31	33	−2	41	Relegation to Treća NL
5	Krk (R)	26	12	3	11	40	42	−2	39	Relegation to Treća NL
6	Uljanik 1948 (R)	26	10	7	9	44	32	+12	37	Relegation to Treća NL
7	Novigrad (R)	26	10	6	10	39	39	0	36	Relegation to Treća NL
8	Rudar Labin (R)	26	11	3	12	37	39	−2	36	Relegation to Treća NL
9	Cres (R)	26	8	5	13	36	44	−8	29	Relegation to Treća NL
10	Nehaj (R)	26	7	8	11	26	40	−14	29	Relegation to Treća NL
11	Buje (R)	26	9	2	15	22	36	−14	29	Relegation to Treća NL
12	Pomorac 1921 (R)	26	7	5	14	32	62	−30	26	Relegation to Treća NL
13	Vinodol (R)	26	5	9	12	31	47	−16	24	Relegation to Treća NL
14	Naprijed Hreljin (R)	26	5	4	17	24	57	−33	19	Relegation to inter-county leagues

Updated to match(es) played on unknown. Source:
Rules for classification: 1) Points, 2) Head-to-head points, 3) Head-to-head goal difference, 4) Goal difference, 5) Matches won, 6) Goals scored
(C) Champions; (R) Relegated

== Promotion play-offs ==
Quarter-finals; 4 June 2022
Mladost Ždralovi	2
Grobničan	1

Semi-finals; 8 June 2022
Mladost Ždralovi	1
Zagorec Krapina	0
Hrvace	0
Vukovar 1991	2

Final; 12 June 2022
Mladost Ždralovi	0
Vukovar 1991	2

== Relegation play-offs ==
Final; 12 June 2022
NK Marsonia 1909	3
Trnje	0
NK Međimurje	3
Hrvatski vitez Posedarje	0

Final
