= Dražen Pernar =

Croatian footballer

Personal information
- Date of birth: 9 September 1971 (age 55)
- Place of birth: Vinkovci, SR Croatia, SFR Yugoslavia
- Position: Defender

Senior career*
Years	Team	Apps	(Gls)
1992–2004	Cibalia	204	(5)
2005–2006	Mladost Vodjinci		
- * Club domestic league appearances and goals

Dražen Pernar (born 9 September 1971) is a retired Croatian football defender.

He played almost his entire career for Cibalia Vinkovci and later became sports director of the club. In 2022 he was sports director at neighboring club Vukovar 1991.
