= NK Zrinski Osječko 1664 =

Association football club in Croatia

- Full name: Nogometni Klub Zrinski Osječko 1664
- Founded: 1937; 89 years ago
- Dissolved: 2025
- Ground: Gradski Vrt Stadium
- Capacity: 18,856
- Chairman: Vedran Dervić
- League: First League (II)
- 2023–24: 2nd
Home colours	Away colours

Nogometni Klub Zrinski Osječko 1664 (until 2023 known as Nogometni klub Zrinski Jurjevac Punitovački) was a Croatian professional football club founded in Jurjevac Punitovački, a village in Osijek-Baranja County, near the city of Osijek.

== History ==
Zrinski was established in 1937 and the owner of a local store, Adam Buček–Ribička, is considered the founder of the club. The club was initially called Sloga, but only four days later it was agreed to rename the club Zrinski after one of Croatia's greats. Officially NK Zrinski was founded on March 1, 1970, when it entered the Municipality of Đakovo register of social organizations. The club's greatest successes before the Yugoslav Wars were playing in the then Intermunicipal League East (1984/85 season).

Since the establishment of the Republic of Croatia, Zrinski had been playing in the 3rd ŽNL Osijek-Baranja until the 2004/2005 season when they clinched promotion as league champions to the 2nd ŽNL. After three seasons, they became league champions of the 2nd ŽNL Osijek-Baranja in the 2008/2009 season and thus reached the 1st ŽNL Osijek-Baranja. In the 2011/2012 season, Zrinski became champions of the 1st ŽNL Osijek-Baranja and moved to the Inter-County League (4th tier) in which clubs from the Osijek-Baranja and Vukovar-Srijem counties compete, thus achieving the success earned by the generation from the 1984/85 season.

== Stadium ==
After promotion to the 2. NL, NK Zrinski hosted domestic matches at in neighbouring Čepin which has a capacity of around 2,500. However, after their promotion to the second division before the 2023/24 season, they moved to Gradski vrt in Osijek.

== Recent seasons ==
Season	Division	P	W	D	L	F	A	Pts	Pos	Cup
Season	League									Cup
2000–01	3. ŽNL Osječko-baranjska	26	7	5	14	35	48	26	10th	
2001–02	3. ŽNL Osječko-baranjska									
2002–03	3. ŽNL Osječko-baranjska	30	14	6	10	75	42	48	9th	
2003–04	3. ŽNL Osječko-baranjska									
2004–05	3. ŽNL Osječko-baranjska								1st	
2005–06	2. ŽNL Osječko-baranjska	30	14	3	13	71	58	45	8th	
2006–07	2. ŽNL Osječko-baranjska	30	17	4	9	70	41	55	4th	
2007–08	2. ŽNL Osječko-baranjska	30	21	6	3	90	31	69	2nd	
2008–09	2. ŽNL Osječko-baranjska	30	25	3	2	92	26	78	1st	
2009–10	1. ŽNL Osječko-baranjska	30	15	7	8	65	35	52	4th	
2010–11	1. ŽNL Osječko-baranjska	29	18	5	6	64	29	59	2nd	
2011–12	1. ŽNL Osječko-baranjska	30	25	2	3	72	23	77	1st	
2012–13	4. HNL	32	20	3	9	65	37	63	3rd	
2013–14	4. HNL	29	18	5	6	77	30	59	1st	
2014–15	3. NL East	30	10	5	15	40	52	35	13th	R1
2015–16	3. NL East	30	17	7	6	65	27	58	3rd	
2016–17	3. NL East	30	15	3	12	54	30	48	4th	
2017–18	3. NL East	30	20	4	6	60	24	64	1st	
2018–19	3. HNL East	30	11	8	11	35	35	41	8th	
2019–20	3. HNL East	17	6	6	5	19	22	24	10th	
2020–21	3. HNL East	34	14	7	13	48	47	49	8th	
2021–22	3. HNL East	34	24	6	4	69	33	78	2nd	
2022–23	2. NL	30	19	6	5	45	22	63	2nd	
2023–24	1. NL	33	26	3	4	53	18	81	2nd	

== Current squad ==
As of 20 November 2023

Note: Flags indicate national team as defined under FIFA eligibility rules; some limited exceptions apply. Players may hold more than one non-FIFA nationality.

No.	Pos.	Nation	Player
1	GK	CRO	Karlo Čović
2	DF	CRO	Bruno Unušić
3	DF	CRO	Tin Kuprešak
4	MF	CRO	Matej Dabić
5	DF	CRO	Luka Ćubel
6	DF	CRO	Patrick Stanić
7	DF	CRO	Stjepan Salapić
8	MF	CRO	Miran Horvat
9	FW	CRO	Domagoj Stranput
10	MF	CRO	Patrick Pejić
11	FW	BIH	Sadik Škrijelj
13	DF	AUT	Gabriel Eskinja (on loan from Slaven Belupo)

No.	Pos.	Nation	Player
14	MF	CRO	Ivijan Svržnjak
16	MF	BIH	Amar Pekarić
17	MF	CRO	Petar Korov
19	MF	CRO	Ivan Jajalo
20	DF	CRO	Luka Posinković
21	FW	BIH	Ajdin Mujagić
23	FW	CRO	Domagoj Jelavić
24	GK	CRO	Marin Stanić
30	FW	CRO	Dominik Dogan
—	MF	SRB	Milan Marčić
—	DF	CRO	Marijan Oršolić
—	DF	CRO	Roko Čilaš
