= Jurjevac Punitovački =

- Village (Selo)
- Location within Osijek-Baranja County Location within Croatia Location within Europe
- Country: Croatia
- Municipality: Punitovci

Area
  - Total: 6.0 km^{2} (2.3 sq mi)

Population (2021)
  - Total: 264
  - Density: 44/km^{2} (110/sq mi)
- Time zone: UTC+1 (CET)
  - Summer (DST): UTC+2 (CEST)

Jurjevac Punitovački is a village in Croatia, part of the municipality of Punitovci, population 264 (2021).

== Sport ==
- NK Zrinski Osječko 1664 (until 2023)
