= Second Football League (Croatia) =

Association football league

Druga NL
- Organising body: HNS
- Founded: 1991 (as Treća HNL)
- Country: Croatia
- Confederation: UEFA
- Number of clubs: 16
- Level on pyramid: 3
- Promotion to: 1. NL
- Relegation to: 3. NL
- Domestic cup: Hrvatski kup
- Current champions: Segesta (2025–26)
- Most championships: Vinogradar (5 titles)
- Current: 2026–27 Second Football League

The Croatian Second Football League (Croatian: Druga nogometna liga), commonly Druga NL or 2. NL, is the third tier of the Croatian football league system. The league was established in 1991, following the dissolution of the Yugoslav League. It is operated by the Croatian Football Federation.

It was previously known as the Third Football League, but was renamed with the other leagues for the start of the 2022–23 season.

== Rules ==
As of 2018, at least three players under 21 years of age must play in each match, and only two foreign nationals are permitted to play for each team.

== Format ==
Since its inception in 1992, the league has changed formats several times. In its inaugural season, the league had four divisions (North, Center, South and West). In the 1992–93 season, a fifth division was added (East). The five-group league continued until the 2006–07 season when the league was re-organised and reduced to three geographical divisions with 18 clubs in each group.

As of 2018, teams are promoted only if they have a valid license to the 2.HNL. For example, NK Vinogradar won the 2017, 2018 and 2019 west division, but were denied promotion since they did not apply for a license.

From the season 2022–23 onward, it is a unified league just as the top two tiers.

== Champions ==
=== 1998–2022 ===
Key

†	Club gained promotion to the unified 2. HNL
^{N}	Club gained promotion to 2. HNL North
^{S}	Club gained promotion to 2. HNL South

Season	Division Center	Division West	Division East	Division South	Division North	Also promoted
1998–99	PIK Vrbovec †	Pomorac Kostrena †	Marsonia †	Mosor †	Čazmatrans †	-
1999–00	TŠK Topolovac †	Žminj †	Papuk †	Hrvatski Vitez^{[1]}	Koprivnica †	-
2000–01	Trnje ^{S}	Uljanik Pula ^{S}	Metalac Osijek ^{N}	GOŠK Dubrovnik ^{S}	Podravac ^{N}	-
2001–02	Napredak VM	Opatija	Dilj ^{N}	Primorac Stobreč	Mladost Prelog	-
2002–03	Segesta ^{S}	Žminj	Slavonija Požega ^{N}	Mosor	Virovitica ^{N}	-
2003–04	Naftaš ^{S}	Draga	Višnjevac	Mosor ^{S}	Bjelovar ^{N}	-
2004–05	Karlovac ^{S}	Istra Pula	Graničar ^{N}	Konavljanin	Mladost Molve ^{N}	-
2005–06	Moslavina †	Jadran Poreč	Croatia Đakovo	GOŠK Dubrovnik	Suhopolje	-
2006–07	-	Vinogradar †	Slavonac CO †	Trogir †	-	Segesta
2007–08	-	Karlovac †	Suhopolje †	Hrvace^{[2]}	-	Lokomotiva, Međimurje, Junak Sinj
2008–09	-	Rudeš †	Grafičar Vodovod^{[3]}	RNK Split †	-	Lučko, Vukovar '91
2009–10	-	Gorica †	Lipik^{[4]}	Dugopolje †	-	HAŠK, MV Croatia
2010–11	-	Radnik Sesvete †	Podravina^{[5]}	Raštane^{[6]}	-	-
2011–12	-	Zelina †	BSK Bijelo Brdo^{[7]}	Raštane^{[6]}	Mladost Ždralovi^{[8]}	Primorac 1929
2012–13	Segesta †	Grobničan^{[10]}	Slavonija^{[11]}	Val^{[13]}	Mladost Ždralovi^{[12]}	-
2013–14	Maksimir^{[14]}	Opatija^{[14]}	BSK Bijelo Brdo^{[14]}	Imotski †	Međimurje^{[14]}	Bistra †
2014–15	-	Dinamo II †	Slavija	Šibenik †	-	-
2015–16	-	Novigrad †	Međimurje	Solin †	-	-
2016–17	-	Vinogradar^{[15]}	Međimurje^{[16]}	Hajduk II †	-	Varaždin †; Kustošija †
2017–18	-	Vinogradar^{[17]}	Osijek II †	Croatia Zmijavci^{[18]}	-	BSK Bijelo Brdo †; Međimurje †; Zadar †
2018–19	-	Vinogradar^{[19]}	Cibalia †	Junak Sinj^{[20]}	-	Dubrava †; Orijent 1919 †; Croatia Zmijavci †
2019–20	Vinogradar	Opatija †	Marsonia	Junak Sinj †	Mladost Ždralovi	-
2020–21	Jarun Zagreb †	Crikvenica	Belišće	Neretvanac	Mladost Ždralovi	-
2021–22	Zagorec Krapina	Crikvenica	Vukovar 1991 †	Jadran LP	Polet	-

=== 2022–present ===
Season	Divisions	Division winners	Clubs promoted to 1. NL	Top scorer	Goals
2022–23	16 clubs	Sesvete	Sesvete; Zrinski Jurjevac	(Croatia) Nikola Marić	22
2023–24	16 clubs	Opatija	Opatija	(Nigeria) Goodness Ajayi	16
2024–25	16 clubs	Hrvace	Hrvace; Karlovac 1919	(Ukraine) Ivan Matyazh	25
2025–26	16 clubs	Segesta	Segesta; Kustošija; Jadran LP; Mladost Ždralovi	(Croatia) Nikola Marić	24

== Notes ==
1. ^{a} : Although Hrvatski Vitez of Posedarje finished top of the 1999–2000 South Division, they were demoted for unknown reasons and competed in the 4th league the following season. South Division runners-up Imotska Krajina were promoted to 2. HNL instead.
2. ^{a} : Although NK Hrvace finished top of the 2007–08 South Division, they did not applied for promotion so South Division runners-up Junak of Sinj were promoted to 2. HNL instead.
3. ^{a} : Although NK Grafičar Vodovod finished top of the 2008–09 East Division, they did not applied for promotion. As only fifth placed NK Vukovar '91 met the needed criteria they were promoted to 2. HNL instead.
4. ^{a} : Although NK Lipik finished top of the 2009–10 East Division, they did not applied for promotion so East Division runners-up MV Croatia of Slavonski Brod were promoted to 2. HNL instead.
5. ^{a} : Although NK Podravina Ludbreg finished top of the 2010–11 East Division and applied for promotion, they subsequently refused promotion for financial reasons. No one from East Division was promoted to 2. HNL instead.
6. ^{a} : Although NK Raštane finished top of the 2010–11 South Division, their application for 2. HNL was refused because of lack of appropriate infrastructure. No one from South Division was promoted to 2. HNL instead.
7. ^{a} : Although NK BSK Bijelo Brdo finished top of the 2011–12 East Division, they did not applied for promotion. No one from East Division was promoted to 2. HNL instead.
8. ^{a} : Although NK Mladost Ždralovi finished top of the 2011–12 North Division, they did not applied for promotion. No one from North Division was promoted to 2. HNL instead.
9. ^{a} : Although NK Raštane finished top of the 2011–12 South Division, they did not applied for promotion so South Division runners-up NK Primorac 1929 were promoted to 2. HNL instead.
10. ^{a} : Although Grobničan finished top of the 2012–13 West Division, they did not apply for promotion. No one from West Division was promoted to 2. HNL instead.
11. ^{a} : Although Slavonija finished top of the 2012–13 East Division, their application for 2. HNL was refused because of lack of appropriate infrastructure. No one from East Division was promoted to 2. HNL instead.
12. ^{a} : Although NK Mladost Ždralovi finished top of the 2012–13 North Division, they did not apply for promotion. No one from North Division was promoted to 2. HNL instead.
13. ^{a} : HNK Val lose against Segesta in play-off.
14. ^{a} : Although Maksimir, Opatija and BSK Bijelo Brdo finished top of their respective 2013–14 divisions, they did not apply for promotion. Međimurje, champion of 3. HNL North Division, applied for promotion but did not met necessary financial and infrastructural requirements.
15. ^{a} : Although NK Vinogradar finished top of the 2016–17 West Division, they did not apply for promotion so West Division runners-up NK Kustošija Zagreb gained promotion to 2. HNL.
16. ^{a} : Although NK Međimurje finished top of the 2016–17 East Division, they did not apply for promotion so East Division runners-up NK Varaždin gained promotion to 2. HNL.
17. ^{a} : Although NK Vinogradar and NK Opatija finished on top of the 2017–18 West Division, they were not promoted as they were not granted a licence for 2. HNL.
18. ^{a} : Although NK Croatia Zmijavci and HNK Primorac Biograd na Moru finished on top of the 2017–18 South Division, they were not promoted as they were not granted a licence for 2. HNL. Third placed NK Zadar gained promotion to 2. HNL.
19. ^{a} : Although NK Vinogradar finished on top of the 2018–19 West Division, they were not promoted as they were not granted a licence for 2. HNL. Second placed NK Dubrava and third placed HNK Orijent 1919 gained promotion to 2. HNL.
20. ^{a} : Although NK Junak Sinj and HNK Primorac Biograd na Moru finished on top of the 2018–19 South Division, they were not promoted as they were not granted a licence for 2. HNL. Third placed NK Croatia Zmijavci gained promotion to 2. HNL.
