= NK Dugo Selo =

Croatian football club

- Full name: Nogometni klub Dugo Selo
- Founded: 1923 (as DŠK)
- Ground: ŠRC Dugo Selo
- Capacity: 300
- Manager: Tihomir Šeperac
- League: Second League (III)
- 2022–23: TBA
Home colours	Away colours

NK Dugo Selo is a Croatian association football club founded in 1923 and based in Dugo Selo, a small town near Zagreb. They compete in the Croatian Third Division.

== Current squad ==
As of 4 February 2023

Note: Flags indicate national team as defined under FIFA eligibility rules; some limited exceptions apply. Players may hold more than one non-FIFA nationality.

No.	Pos.	Nation	Player
1	GK	CRO	Ivan Mandić
2	DF	CRO	Ivan Bastalec
3	DF	CRO	Robert Kajtazi
3	DF	CRO	Marin Božanović
4	FW	CRO	Karlo Darojković
5	DF	CRO	Ivan Filipović
6		CRO	Leon Valek
7	MF	CRO	Petar Radoš
8	MF	CRO	Mihovil Rašić
9	FW	BIH	Đevad Selman
10	MF	CRO	Maks Slunjski
11	FW	CRO	Fran Petković
12	GK	CRO	Matej Barkić

No.	Pos.	Nation	Player
14	DF	CRO	Marijan Starčić
15	MF	CRO	Martin Franjčić
16	MF	CRO	Patrik Razum
16	DF	CRO	Marko Salar
17	MF	CRO	Jurica Kovačić
18		CRO	Filip Marušić
19	MF	CRO	Ivan Palić
19		CRO	Bruno Milković
20		CRO	Juraj Starčić
22		CRO	Matej Šarić
22	DF	BIH	Ivan Mustapić
