= NK Trnje =

Croatian football club

- Full name: NK Trnje Zagreb
- Founded: 1924; 102 years ago
- Ground: SC Trnje
- Capacity: 1,000
- Chairman: Jakov Sivrić
- Manager: Senad Harambašić
- League: Second League (III)
- TBA
- Website: www.nktrnje.com
| Home colours | Away colours |

NK Trnje is a Croatian football club based in the city of Zagreb, founded in 1924. They currently play in the Treća HNL, the third division of Croatian football.

== History ==
NK Trnje won the 2000-01 Treća HNL championship by six points, gaining promotion to the 2. HNL. However they finished 15th in their only season in the second division and were relegated.

== Stadium ==
Their home stadium was built in 1980.

In 2017, the club constructed an auxiliary training field at the cost of 5 million kuna which meets the highest European standards.

== Honours ==
- (Croatia) Treća HNL – Center:
  - Winners (1): 2000–01

== Current squad ==
As of 1 April 2026

Note: Flags indicate national team as defined under FIFA eligibility rules; some limited exceptions apply. Players may hold more than one non-FIFA nationality.

| No. | Pos. | Nation | Player |
|---|---|---|---|
| 1 | GK | CRO | Dean Vujinović |
| 2 | FW | CRO | Robert Zec |
| 3 | DF | BIH | Luka Brkić |
| 4 | MF | CRO | Karlo Prpić Bosanac |
| 5 | FW | VIE | Antonio Morić |
| 6 | DF | CRO | Petar Baneković |
| 7 | FW | CRO | Marko Bibić |
| 8 | FW | CRO | Denis Ceraj |
| 11 | FW | CRO | Fran Beloša Fijan |
| 12 | GK | CRO | Šimun Rendulić |
| 12 | GK | CRO | Domagoj Cestarić |
| 13 | DF | CRO | Igor Ribić |
| 14 | | CRO | Vanja Šare |

| No. | Pos. | Nation | Player |
|---|---|---|---|
| 15 | FW | CRO | Domagoj Ninčević |
| 16 | | CRO | Matej Markanović |
| 17 | DF | CRO | Karlo Dobrilović |
| 18 | DF | BIH | Dino Mizić |
| 19 | | CRO | Kristijan Mandić |
| 20 | MF | CRO | Luka Povoljnjak |
| 21 | FW | CRO | Dario Banić |
| 22 | FW | GHA | Patrick Junior Osei Kesse |
| 23 | | CRO | Luka Šinko |
| 25 | DF | CRO | Vito Heteši |
| 27 | DF | CRO | Ivan Čolić |
| 29 | | CRO | Fran Došen |
| 29 | | CRO | Fran Došen |
