= NK Krk =

Croatian football club

- Full name: Nogometni klub Krk
- Founded: 1940; 86 years ago
- Ground: SRC Josip Uravić Pepi; Stadion Kantrida
- Capacity: 600; 10,600
- Chairman: Denis Šikljan
- Manager: Damir Kraljić
- League: Druga NL
- 2022–23: Druga NL
Home colours	Away colours

NK Krk is a Croatian football club founded in 1940 and based in the town of Krk on the island of Krk.

== History ==
NK Krk was founded in 1940 at the Krk Hotel and played local teams for the first time in 1941. The club's original kit color was navy blue. It played its first match after the Second World War in 1946. From 1947, the football club was part of the larger sports club SD Partizan, but it only competed against local teams until the 1970s, as Krk was not connected to the mainland by road until 1980.

The club was promoted to the Croatian Second League in 2023, the best performance in the club's history to date. The club played several matches in nearby Rijeka's Kantrida stadion while their ground was undergoing reconstruction, but returned to Krk in 2024.

Krk defeated HNK Cibalia 1:0 in the 2018–19 Croatian Football Cup to reach the round of 16, where the club was defeated by Osijek. NK Krk qualified for the cup by winning the Primorje-Gorski Kotar County cup the season prior.
