= Ždralovi =

- Village
- Location within Croatia
- Coordinates: 45°53′N 16°52′E
- Country: Croatia
- County: Bjelovar-Bilogora County
- Municipality: Bjelovar

Area
  - Total: 3.0 sq mi (7.7 km^{2})

Population (2021)
  - Total: 1,311
  - Density: 440/sq mi (170/km^{2})
- Time zone: UTC+1 (CET)
  - Summer (DST): UTC+2 (CEST)

Ždralovi is a suburb of the city of Bjelovar.

== Demographics ==
According to the 2021 census, its population was 1,311. It was 1,423 in 2011.
