= NK Grobničan =

Croatian football club

Grobničan
- Full name: Nogometni klub Grobničan Čavle
- Founded: 1932; 93 years ago
- Ground: Stadion Mavrinci
- Capacity: 3,000
- Manager: Predrag Stilinović
- League: Second League
- 2021–22: 3. HNL – West, 2nd of 14
- Website: https://nkgrobnican.hr/
Home colours	Away colours

Nogometni klub Grobničan or simply NK Grobničan is a Croatian football club based in the town of Čavle which competes in the Croatian Second League, the third tier of the Croatian football pyramid.

== Honours ==
- Treća HNL – West:

Winners (1): 2012–13

- Četvrta HNL – West:

Winners (1): 2007–08

- Četvrta HNL – Rijeka:

Winners (2): 2017–18, 2018–19

== Current squad ==
As of 4 February 2023

Note: Flags indicate national team as defined under FIFA eligibility rules; some limited exceptions apply. Players may hold more than one non-FIFA nationality.

No.	Pos.	Nation	Player
2	DF	CRO	Duje Ušalj
4	MF	CRO	Franko Bosančić
7	DF	USA	Chase Van Wey
8	MF	CRO	Karlo Valjan
9	MF	CRO	Borna Kovačević
10	FW	CRO	Dražen Pilčić
11	FW	CRO	Marino Matković
12	GK	CRO	Dino Curać
13	MF	GHA	Jacob Aboosah
14	MF	GHA	Prince Arthur
15	MF	CRO	Domagoj Prpić

No.	Pos.	Nation	Player
16	DF	CRO	Ivan Rupčić
17	MF	CRO	David Golić
18	DF	CRO	Andre Franković
20	DF	CRO	Antonio Galešić
21	MF	CRO	Filip Batarelo
22	FW	CRO	Domagoj Prtenjača
24	MF	CRO	Tin Jurica
25	FW	CRO	Din Pozderac
26	DF	CRO	Luka Mikulica
45	GK	CRO	Carlo Berković
92	GK	CRO	Ređep Ademaj
