= NK Slavija Pleternica =

Croatian football club

- Full name: NK Slavija Pleternica
- Founded: 1926
- Ground: Stjepan Zdenko Šivo, Pleternica
- Capacity: 700
- Chairman: Marinko Markota
- Manager: Dalibor Bognar
- League: Treća HNL East
- 2017–18: Treća HNL East, 8th
Home colours	Away colours

NK Slavija Pleternica is a Croatian football club based in the town of Pleternica
