= NK Slavonija Požega =

Croatian football club

NK Slavonija
- Full name: NK Slavonija Požega
- Ground: ŠRC Požega
- Capacity: 1,000
- Manager: Krešimir Čuljak
- League: Druga NL
- 2025–26: Treća NL East, 1st (promoted)
Home colours	Away colours

NK Slavonija is a Croatian football club based in the town of Požega in Slavonia.

== History ==
The club was founded in 1946 as SD Jedinstvo. Since 1959 it has been named NK Zvečevo. In 1964, the two football clubs from Požega, NK Zvečevo Slavonska Požega and NK Radnički Slavonska Požega, merged into the new NK Slavonija at the end of the autumn part of the 1963 season.

== Honours ==
(Croatia) Treća NL – East:

- Winners (5): 2002–03, 2012–13, 2022–23, 2023–24, 2025–26

== Current squad ==
As of 23 April 2023

Note: Flags indicate national team as defined under FIFA eligibility rules; some limited exceptions apply. Players may hold more than one non-FIFA nationality.

No.	Pos.	Nation	Player
2	DF	CRO	Marko Milobara
3	DF	CRO	Antun Kvaternik
4		CRO	Ivan Lončarević
5		CRO	Josip Dupor
6	FW	CRO	Krešimir Plešić
7	MF	CRO	Alen Jagodić
8	FW	CRO	Mato Marčetić
9		CRO	Filip Margeta
10	FW	CRO	Ivan Antunović
11	FW	CRO	Matej Martinović
12	GK	CRO	Ivan Kraljak

No.	Pos.	Nation	Player
13		CRO	David Vidović
14	MF	CRO	Matej Peharda
15	FW	CRO	Roko Anić
16	DF	CRO	Ivan Peharda
17	DF	CRO	Martin Šubara
18		CRO	Toni Barišić
18		CRO	Tvrtko Janković
19		CRO	Žarko Dominik Jakovljević
20		CRO	Ante Novak
22	FW	CRO	Karlo Kovre
23	GK	CRO	Ivan Petković
