= NK Radnik Križevci =

Croatian football club

Radnik Križevci
- Full name: Nogometni klub Radnik Križevci
- Founded: 1963; 63 years ago
- Ground: Križevci City Stadium
- Capacity: 1,500

Nogometni klub Radnik Križevci (English: Radnik Križevci Football Club), commonly referred to as NK Radnik Križevci or simply Radnik Križevci, is a Croatian football club based in the town of Križevci.
