= NK Jadran Poreč =

Croatian football club

NK Jadran
- Full name: NK Jadran Poreč
- Founded: 1948; 77 years ago
- Ground: Veli Jože
- Capacity: 2,000
- Chairman: Edvard Ribarić
- Manager: Dalibor Šuran
- League: Second League (III)
- 2022–23: TBA
Home colours	Away colours

NK Jadran Poreč is a Croatian football club based in the city of Poreč. It was founded in 1948 by Croatian handball player Lujo Györy.

== History ==
Jadran began play in the Croatian second division in 1992–93.

Jadran won the 1996-97 3.HNL zapad (west) group.

Jadran participated in the promotion playoffs for the 1.HNL in 1997–98 after winning the zapad (west) group, finishing second in their group and failing to advance. They were relegated to the 3.HNL in 2001 after finishing last and losing the promotion playoff.

Jadran played in the 2013 Croatian cup, losing in the first round to Slaven Belupo.

In 2017 the club, along with the Croatian football association HNS, was involved in a lawsuit for attempting to avoid debts to a former player.

== Honours ==
- (Croatia) Treća HNL – West:
  - Winners (1): 2005–06
- (Croatia) Inter-county League Rijeka:
  - Winners (1): 2015–16

== Current squad ==
As of 2 April 2023

Note: Flags indicate national team as defined under FIFA eligibility rules; some limited exceptions apply. Players may hold more than one non-FIFA nationality.

No.	Pos.	Nation	Player
1	GK	(Croatia) CRO	Borna Rupenović
2	DF	(Croatia) CRO	Filip Šverko
4	DF	(Croatia) CRO	Kledi Baki Ramadani
5	FW	(Croatia) CRO	Ivan Jakovčić
6	DF	(Croatia) CRO	Adam Mofardin
7	MF	(Croatia) CRO	Sandro Užila
8	FW	(Croatia) CRO	Ivan Al Tharwan
9	FW	(Croatia) CRO	Filip Filipović
10	MF	(Croatia) CRO	Igor Lepinjica
12	GK	(Croatia) CRO	Antonio Matošović
13	FW	(Croatia) CRO	Mate Ivetić
14	DF	(Croatia) CRO	Oliver Sumić
15	MF	(Croatia) CRO	Filip Mendiković

No.	Pos.	Nation	Player
16	MF	(Croatia) CRO	Patrik Srzentić
18	MF	(Saudi Arabia) KSA	Safwan Saud S Aljohani
19	MF	(Croatia) CRO	Noel Žiković
20	MF	(Croatia) CRO	Antonio Siljan
21	MF	(Croatia) CRO	Donato Bernobić
22	DF	(Croatia) CRO	Noa Zuliani
23	DF	(Croatia) CRO	Vedran Radman
24	MF	(Saudi Arabia) KSA	Ausamah Zaid T Alharbi
33	DF	(Croatia) CRO	Paolo Bernobić
70	GK	(Croatia) CRO	Antonio Pavlić
77	FW	(Brazil) BRA	Rodrigo Silva Lima
99	FW	(Croatia) CRO	Robert Vlizlo
