= NK Mladost Ždralovi =

Croatian football club

- Full name: Nogometni klub Mladost Ždralovi
- Nickname: The Cranes
- Founded: 1933; 93 years ago
- Ground: Stadion Brdo
- Capacity: 1,000
- Head coach: Tihomir Bradić
- League: First League (III)
- 2025–26: Second League, 4th (promoted)
Home colours	Away colours

NK Mladost Ždralovi is a Croatian professional football club in the village of Ždralovi, near city of Bjelovar. The club was founded in 1933. In 2021. they had the opportunity to go to the 2. HNL, but NK Jarun knocked them out with a score of 1:0.

== Honours ==
(Croatia) Treća HNL – North:

- Winners (2): 2011–12, 2012–13, 2020–21
