= Croatia national under-15 football team =

National association football team

Croatia U15
- Nickname: Mladi Vatreni (The Young Blazers)
- Association: Croatian Football Federation (HNS)
- Confederation: UEFA (Europe)
- Head coach: Sreten Ćuk
- Most caps: Luka Bartulović (12) Lovro Benko (12)
- Top scorer: Marin Nekić (8)
- FIFA code: CRO
First colours	Second colours

First international
- Croatia 3–0 Slovenia (Zabok, Croatia; 10 May 1994)

Biggest win
- Croatia 9–0 Lithuania (Ivanić-Grad, Croatia; 18 September 2024)

Biggest defeat
- Croatia 0–6 Argentina (Medulin, Croatia; 12 April 2019)
- Website: hns-cff.hr

The Croatia national under-15 football team represents Croatia in international football matches for players aged 15 or younger. It is governed by the Croatian Football Federation, the governing body for football in Croatia. It is a member of UEFA in Europe and FIFA in global competitions. The team's colours reference two national symbols: the Croatian checkerboard and the country's tricolour. They are colloquially referred to as the Mali vatreni ('Little Blazers'). The Mali vatreni participate in the UEFA Under-15 Development Tournaments, finishing as runners-up in the 2023 tournament in Croatia, their first appearance in the tournament. Other than that, the team competes in the Vlatko Marković International Tournament, established by the HNS in 2019. The team won the tournament three times, in 2021, 2022 and 2023.

== Recent results ==
The following is a list of match results from the last 12 months, along with any future matches scheduled.

Win Draw Loss Fixture

== Players ==
=== Current squad ===
The following players were called up for the summer camp in Stubičke Toplice from 4 to 9 August 2023.

No.	Pos.	Player	Date of birth (age)	Caps	Goals	Club
	GK	Fran Gračanin	3 September 2009 (age 17)	0	0	(Croatian Football Federation) Lokomotiva Zagreb
	GK	Roko Burger	20 June 2009 (age 17)	0	0	(Croatian Football Federation) Hajduk
	GK	Josip Pandurić	11 March 2009 (age 17)	0	0	(Croatian Football Federation) Hajduk
	DF	Elisandro Kožina Aranha	9 February 2009 (age 17)	0	0	(Croatian Football Federation) Gorica
	DF	Franko Hećimović	16 February 2009 (age 17)	0	0	(Croatian Football Federation) Lokomotiva Zagreb
	DF	Lovro Renić	3 February 2009 (age 17)	0	0	(Croatian Football Federation) Lokomotiva Zagreb
	DF	Mateo Sabo	23 April 2009 (age 17)	0	0	(Croatian Football Federation) Osijek
	DF	Ivano Gubo	26 March 2009 (age 17)	0	0	(Croatian Football Federation) Rijeka
	DF	Manuel Landripet	19 May 2009 (age 17)	0	0	(Croatian Football Federation) Rudeš
	DF	Duje Slatina	26 June 2009 (age 17)	0	0	(Croatian Football Federation) Hajduk
	DF	Andro Slaviček	16 January 2009 (age 17)	0	0	(Croatian Football Federation) Dinamo Zagreb
	DF	Ante Šimović	9 June 2009 (age 17)	0	0	(Croatian Football Federation) Hajduk
	DF	Viktor Vešligaj	26 December 2009 (age 16)	0	0	(Croatian Football Federation) Rijeka
	MF	Ivan Bilobrk	22 January 2009 (age 17)	0	0	(Croatian Football Federation) Lučko
	MF	Adriano Debelec	12 May 2009 (age 17)	0	0	(Croatian Football Federation) Varaždin
	MF	Filip Kutleša	17 February 2009 (age 17)	0	0	(Croatian Football Federation) Slaven Belupo
	MF	Karlo Matko	9 October 2009 (age 17)	0	0	(Croatian Football Federation) Hajduk
	MF	Matej Miličić	21 September 2009 (age 17)	0	0	(Croatian Football Federation) Osijek
	MF	Marin Modrić	5 August 2009 (age 17)	0	0	(Croatian Football Federation) Hajduk
	MF	Ivan Paunović	20 July 2009 (age 17)	0	0	(Croatian Football Federation) Dinamo Zagreb
	MF	Nik Škafar Žužić	3 June 2009 (age 17)	0	0	(Croatian Football Federation) Istra 1961
	MF	Karlo Zirdum	21 January 2009 (age 17)	0	0	(Croatian Football Federation) Dinamo Zagreb
	FW	Duje Ćukušić	3 September 2009 (age 17)	0	0	(Croatian Football Federation) Hajduk
	FW	Dino Deklić	30 April 2009 (age 17)	0	0	(Croatian Football Federation) Dinamo Zagreb
	FW	Leo Habek	15 June 2009 (age 17)	0	0	(Croatian Football Federation) Varaždin
	FW	Mihael Kelava	29 May 2009 (age 17)	0	0	(Croatian Football Federation) Gorica
	FW	Lovro Mikulčić	23 May 2009 (age 17)	0	0	(Croatian Football Federation) Varaždin

== Competitive record ==
Champions
Runners-up
Third place
Fourth place
Tournament played fully or partially on home soil

=== UEFA Under-15 Development Tournament record ===
Year	Round	Position	Pld	W	D	L	GF	GA
(Croatia) 2023 UEFA Under-15 Development Tournament	Runners-up	2nd	3	1	1	1	4	2
Total	0 titles	1/1	3	1	1	1	4	2

Draws include matches decided via penalty shoot-out; correct as of 25 September 2023 after the match against Turkey.

Matches
First match	Croatia 2–0 Slovakia (Kotoriba, Croatia; 20 September 2023)
Biggest win	Croatia 2–0 Slovakia (Kotoriba, Croatia; 20 September 2023)
Biggest defeat	Croatia 0–1 Slovenia (Varaždin, Croatia; 22 September 2023)

=== Vlatko Marković International Tournament record ===
Year	Round	Position	Pld	W	D	L	GF	GA
(Croatia) 2019 Vlatko Marković International Tournament	Semi-final	4th	4	4	0	0	5	8
(Croatia) 2021 Vlatko Marković International Tournament	Champions	1st	4	4	0	0	14	3
(Croatia) 2022 Vlatko Marković International Tournament	Champions	1st	4	4	0	0	10	1
(Croatia) 2023 Vlatko Marković International Tournament	Champions	1st	4	3	1	0	11	1
(Croatia) 2025 Vlatko Marković International Tournament	Runners-up	2nd	4	2	1	1	7	4
Total	3 titles	5/5	20	16	2	2	47	17

Draws include knockout matches decided via penalty shoot-out; correct as of 18 May 2025 after the match against Portugal.

Matches
First match	Croatia 1–0 China (Pula, Croatia; 10 April 2019)
Biggest win	Croatia 7–1 North Macedonia (Karlovac, Croatia; 6 May 2021)
Biggest defeat	Croatia 0–6 Argentina (Medulin, Croatia; 12 April 2019)

== See also ==
- Croatia national football team
- Croatia national football B team
- Croatia national under-23 football team
- Croatia national under-21 football team
- Croatia national under-20 football team
- Croatia national under-19 football team
- Croatia national under-18 football team
- Croatia national under-17 football team
- Croatia national under-16 football team
- Croatia women's national football team
- Croatia women's national under-19 football team
- Croatia women's national under-17 football team
- Croatia women's national under-15 football team
