= Luka Jagačić =

Croatian footballer

Luka Jagacic
Personal information
- Date of birth: 26 October 1990 (age 36)
- Place of birth: Varaždin, SFR Yugoslavia
- Height: 1.87 m (6 ft 2 in)
- Position: Midfielder

Team information
- Current team: Keflavik [director of football]

Youth career
- –2009: Varteks

Senior career*
| Years | Team | Apps | (Gls) |
| 2009–2010 | Varteks | 18 | (0) |
| 2011 | → Pomorac (loan) | 7 | (0) |
| 2011–2012 | Varaždin | 13 | (0) |
| 2012–2013 | Gorica | 14 | (1) |
| 2013–2015 | Selfoss | 53 | (7) |
| 2016–2017 | Varaždin | 18 | (1) |
| 2018 | Njarðvík | 20 | (1) |
| 2019 | Reynir | 0 | (0) |

International career
| 2005 | Croatia U15 | 2 | (0) |
| 2005–2006 | Croatia U16 | 8 | (1) |
| 2008 | Croatia U18 | 4 | (0) |
| 2008 | Croatia U19 | 1 | (0) |
- * Club domestic league appearances and goals as of 8 August 2022

Luka Jagačić (born 26 October 1990) is a Croatian retired football midfielder who currently is director of football at Icelandic team Keflavik.

== Club career ==
Jagačić started his career playing at youth level for Varteks. He made his debut for the first team against Cibalia on 1 March 2009 in the Croatian top-level 1.HNL as a second-half substitute. The club lost its main sponsor, Varteks clothing factory, in 2010, and changed its 52-year-old name to NK Varaždin. Jagačić was loaned to Pomorac Kostrena in 2011, returned to play with the renamed NK Varaždin, then went on to play with HNK Gorica and Selfoss.

Jagačić returned to the hometown of Varaždin in 2016; the original NK Varaždin had folded in 2015, and he signed with a different, unassociated NK Varaždin.

In 2019, he joined Reynir but he never played a league game because of injury.

== International career ==
Internationally, Luka Jagačić earned 15 Croatia national under-15/16/18/19 football team caps in 2005–2008.
