= Croatia national under-18 football team =

Croatia U18
- Nickname: Mladi Vatreni (The Young Blazers)
- Association: Croatian Football Federation (HNS)
- Confederation: UEFA (Europe)
- Head coach: Robert Jarni
- Captain: Luka Vrbančić
- Most caps: Franko Andrijašević (12)
- Top scorer: Marko Dugandžić (6)
- FIFA code: CRO
First colours	Second colours

First international
- Croatia 1–0 Slovenia (Samobor, Croatia; 22 April 1993)

Biggest win
- Croatia 7–0 Belgium (Ludbreg, Croatia; 3 September 2025)

Biggest defeat
- Italy 4–0 Croatia (Salerno, Italy; 11 June 2004) Croatia 0–4 Norway (Kotoriba, Croatia; 5 June 2024)
- Website: hns-cff.hr

The Croatia national under-18 football team represents Croatia in international football matches for players aged 18 or younger. It is governed by the Croatian Football Federation, the governing body for football in Croatia. The team's colours reference two national symbols: the Croatian checkerboard and the country's tricolour. They are colloquially referred to as the Mladi vatreni ('Young Blazers').

== Recent results ==
The following is a list of match results from the last 12 months, as well as any future matches scheduled.

Win Draw Loss Fixture

== Current squad ==
The following is the squad named for the friendly tournament played in Umag in Croatia, from 11 to 17 October 2023.

No.	Pos.	Player	Date of birth (age)	Caps	Goals	Club
	GK	Jan Hlapčić	7 April 2006 (age 20)	3	0	(Croatian Football Federation) Osijek
	GK	Mihael Letica	15 April 2006 (age 20)	4	0	(Croatian Football Federation) Slaven Belupo
	GK	Marko Juršić	9 June 2006 (age 20)	1	0	(Croatian Football Federation) Istra 1961
	DF	Dorian Migalić	12 January 2006 (age 20)	3	0	(German Football Association) VfB Stuttgart
	DF	Marino Skelin	18 September 2006 (age 20)	5	1	(Croatian Football Federation) Hajduk Split
	DF	Ante Utrobičić	12 July 2006 (age 20)	6	0	(Croatian Football Federation) Lokomotiva Zagreb
	DF	Luka Hodak	10 June 2006 (age 20)	6	0	(Croatian Football Federation) Hajduk
	DF	Ante Sušak	20 January 2006 (age 20)	4	0	(Croatian Football Federation) Dinamo Zagreb
	DF	Lukas Mikolaj	3 May 2006 (age 20)	2	0	(Croatian Football Federation) Varaždin
	DF	David Skukan	2 February 2006 (age 20)	1	0	(Croatian Football Federation) Mladost Ždralovi
	MF	Sergej Levak	2 May 2006 (age 20)	6	0	(Italian Football Federation) Roma
	MF	Leon Lalić	23 January 2006 (age 20)	5	0	(Austrian Football Association) Salzburg
	MF	Sven Lesjak	23 August 2006 (age 20)	3	0	(Croatian Football Federation) Varaždin
	MF	David Zubović	30 May 2006 (age 20)	4	0	(Croatian Football Federation) Rijeka
	MF	Duje Reić	29 May 2006 (age 20)	3	0	(Croatian Football Federation) Hajduk Split
	MF	Antonio Baždarić	8 January 2006 (age 20)	5	1	(Croatian Football Federation) Lokomotiva Zagreb
	MF	Leon Ivančić	12 March 2006 (age 20)	5	0	(Croatian Football Federation) Lokomotiva
	MF	Luka Rešetar	21 April 2006 (age 20)	4	0	(Croatian Football Federation) Mladost Ždralovi
	MF	Mate Ivković	4 January 2006 (age 20)	4	1	(Italian Football Federation) Roma
	FW	Dominik Babić	5 September 2006 (age 20)	3	2	(Croatian Football Federation) Osijek
	FW	Filip Živković	1 August 2006 (age 20)	3	2	(Croatian Football Federation) Osijek
	FW	Noa Kljajić	19 May 2006 (age 20)	3	0	(German Football Association) 1. FSV Mainz 05
	FW	Marino Žeravica	26 March 2006 (age 20)	2	0	(Croatian Football Federation) Hajduk
	FW	Toni Majić	3 May 2006 (age 20)	2	1	(Croatian Football Federation) Dinamo Zagreb
	FW	Leo Rimac	14 March 2006 (age 20)	3	1	(Croatian Football Federation) Dinamo Zagreb

=== Recent call-ups ===
The following players have been called up to the squad in the last 12 months.

Pos.	Player	Date of birth (age)	Caps	Goals	Club	Latest call-up
GK	Eugen Ciban	4 March 2005 (age 21)	1	0	(Croatia) Rudeš	UEFA European Under-17 Championship
GK	Karlo Jurak	5 March 2005 (age 21)	3	0	(Croatia) Istra 1961	UEFA European Under-17 Championship
DF	Roko Perković	8 May 2005 (age 21)	6	0	(Croatia) Osijek	UEFA European Under-17 Championship
DF	Matija Ruškovački	24 May 2005 (age 21)	5	0	(Croatia) Dinamo Zagreb	UEFA European Under-17 Championship
DF	Luka Barić	3 July 2005 (age 21)	1	0	(Croatia) Osijek	UEFA European Under-17 Championship
DF	Viktor Damjanić	3 November 2005 (age 21)	7	0	(Croatia) Šibenik	UEFA European Under-17 Championship
DF	Ivan Cvetko	23 November 2005 (age 20)	5	0	(Croatia) Dinamo Zagreb	UEFA European Under-17 Championship
DF	Vito Težak	31 March 2005 (age 21)	3	0	(Croatia) Varaždin	UEFA European Under-17 Championship
DF	Patrik Majdandžić	31 March 2005 (age 21)	6	0	(Croatia) Dinamo Zagreb	UEFA European Under-17 Championship
DF	Erik Riđan	24 October 2005 (age 21)	3	0	(Croatia) Slaven Belupo	UEFA European Under-17 Championship
MF	Marin Ćalušić	8 July 2006 (age 20)	3	0	(Croatia) Hajduk Split	v. Saudi Arabia, 18 September 2023
MF	Noa Skoko	12 January 2006 (age 20)	3	1	(Croatia) Hajduk Split	v. Saudi Arabia, 18 September 2023
MF	Marin Prekodravac	3 March 2005 (age 21)	6	0	(Croatia) Osijek	UEFA European Under-17 Championship
MF	Marin Žgomba	30 May 2005 (age 21)	8	0	(Croatia) NK Istra 1961	UEFA European Under-17 Championship
MF	Ivan Canjuga	30 November 2005 (age 20)	5	0	(Croatia) Lokomotiva Zagreb	UEFA European Under-17 Championship
MF	Zlatan Koščević	12 February 2005 (age 21)	2	0	(Croatia) Dinamo Zagreb	UEFA European Under-17 Championship
MF	Luka Vrbančić	4 July 2005 (age 21)	6	1	(Croatia) Dinamo Zagreb	UEFA European Under-17 Championship
MF	Franco Corelli	29 March 2005 (age 21)	3	0	(Croatia) NK Istra 1961	UEFA European Under-17 Championship
FW	Lovre Lončar	11 May 2006 (age 20)	3	2	(Croatia) Hajduk	v. Saudi Arabia, 18 September 2023
FW	Anton Matković	19 February 2006 (age 20)	3	3	(Croatia) Osijek	v. Saudi Arabia, 18 September 2023
FW	Bartol Kardum	18 July 2006 (age 20)	3	0	(Croatia) Lokomotiva	v. Saudi Arabia, 18 September 2023
FW	Filip Mažar	24 March 2005 (age 21)	3	0	(Croatia) Osijek	UEFA European Under-17 Championship
FW	Luka Kapulica	18 January 2005 (age 21)	6	1	(Croatia) Gorica	UEFA European Under-17 Championship
FW	Filip Markanović	13 January 2005 (age 21)	5	0	(Croatia) Lokomotiva Zagreb	UEFA European Under-17 Championship
FW	Lorenzo Travaglia	12 January 2005 (age 21)	6	0	(Croatia) NK Istra 1961	UEFA European Under-17 Championship
FW	Lovro Nezirović	27 May 2005 (age 21)	4	0	(Croatia) Gorica	UEFA European Under-17 Championship

== Head-to-head record ==
Key

More wins than losses
As many wins as losses
Fewer wins than losses

Correct as of 4 June 2026, after the match against Turkey.

Opponent	Pld	W	D	L	GF	GA	GD	Win %
Albania	1	1	0	0	2	0	+2	100.00
Austria	2	1	1	0	6	3	+3	50.00
Belgium	5	2	1	2	9	4	+5	40.00
Bosnia and Herzegovina	13	10	1	2	32	11	+21	76.92
Brazil	2	0	1	1	2	3	−1	0.00
Czech Republic	11	8	2	1	19	11	+8	72.73
Denmark	4	2	2	0	3	1	+2	50.00
England	4	2	1	1	5	4	+1	50.00
Finland	1	0	1	0	2	2	+0	0.00
France	3	0	2	1	1	2	−1	0.00
Germany	2	0	1	1	0	3	−3	0.00
Hungary	6	1	1	4	5	11	−6	16.67
Israel	2	0	1	1	1	2	−1	0.00
Italy	6	0	2	4	4	13	−9	0.00
Japan	6	1	2	3	6	11	−5	16.67
Latvia	2	1	0	1	4	4	+0	50.00
Mexico	4	1	1	2	6	8	−2	25.00
Montenegro	2	0	0	2	3	7	−4	0.00
Netherlands	1	1	0	0	3	2	+1	100.00
New Zealand	1	1	0	0	4	1	+3	100.00
Nigeria	1	1	0	0	3	2	+1	100.00
Norway	6	2	2	2	6	9	−3	33.33
Poland	9	4	2	3	16	10	+6	44.44
Portugal	4	1	1	2	4	5	−1	25.00
Qatar	4	2	2	0	7	1	+6	50.00
Republic of Ireland	3	0	2	1	1	4	−3	0.00
Romania	3	2	0	1	5	1	+4	66.67
Russia	1	1	0	0	2	1	+1	100.00
Saudi Arabia	4	3	1	0	8	2	+6	75.00
Serbia	1	0	0	1	1	2	−1	0.00
Slovakia	6	1	4	1	6	6	+0	16.67
Slovenia	15	9	3	3	16	6	+10	60.00
South Korea	2	1	1	0	7	5	+2	50.00
Spain	1	0	0	1	0	2	−2	0.00
Sweden	2	1	0	1	3	2	+1	50.00
Switzerland	4	0	3	1	4	5	−1	0.00
Turkey	7	4	3	0	17	7	+10	57.14
Ukraine	6	3	2	1	6	3	+3	50.00
United Arab Emirates	1	1	0	0	2	1	+1	100.00
Wales	4	3	0	1	8	5	+3	75.00
31 teams played	162	71	46	45	239	182	+57	43.83

== See also ==
- Croatia national football team
- Croatia national football B team
- Croatia national under-23 football team
- Croatia national under-21 football team
- Croatia national under-20 football team
- Croatia national under-19 football team
- Croatia national under-17 football team
- Croatia national under-16 football team
- Croatia national under-15 football team
- Croatia women's national football team
- Croatia women's national under-19 football team
- Croatia women's national under-17 football team
- Croatia women's national under-15 football team
