= Croatia national under-17 football team =

National association football team

Croatia U17
- Nickname: Mali Vatreni (The Young Blazers)
- Association: Croatian Football Federation (HNS)
- Confederation: UEFA (Europe)
- Head coach: Marijan Budimir
- Most caps: Milan Badelj (28)
- Top scorer: Nikola Kalinić (15)
- FIFA code: CRO
First colours	Second colours

First international
- Croatia 1–0 Hungary (Donji Miholjac, Croatia; 26 April 1993)

Biggest win
- Croatia 11–0 Andorra (Donji Tavankut, Serbia; 29 September 2004); Croatia 11–0 Malaysia (Čakovec, Croatia; 7 November 2025)

Biggest defeat
- Croatia 0–5 Norway (Tallinn, Estonia; 25 October 2006) Croatia 0–5 England (Pula, Croatia; 28 September 2016) Republic of Ireland 5–0 Croatia (Larnaca, Cyprus; 26 March 2024)

European Championship
- Appearances: 10 (first in 1996)
- Best result: Third place (2001)

World Cup
- Appearances: 5 (first in 2001)
- Best result: Quarter-finals (2015)
- Website: hns-cff.hr

The Croatia national under-17 football team represents Croatia in international football matches for players aged 17 or under. It is governed by the Croatian Football Federation, the governing body for football in Croatia. It is a member of UEFA in Europe and FIFA in global competitions. The team's colours reference two national symbols: the Croatian checkerboard and the country's tricolour. They are colloquially referred to as the Mali vatreni ('Little Blazers'). So far, the Mali vatreni qualified for nine UEFA European Under-17 Championships. Croatia's greatest success in the tournament was third place in 2001. The team also finished fourth in 2005. Croatia also participated in five FIFA U-17 World Cups since its independence, in 2001, 2013, 2015, 2025 and 2026, being eliminated in quarter-finals in 2015, its biggest success so far in this tournament.

== Recent results and fixtures ==
The following is a list of match results in the last 12 months, as well as any future matches that have been scheduled.

Win Draw Loss Fixture

== Players ==
=== Current squad ===
The following players were called up for the most recent 2026 UEFA European Under-17 Championship qualification matches.

No.	Pos.	Player	Date of birth (age)	Club
1	GK	Lovro Lojen	27 July 2010 (age 16)	(Croatian Football Federation) Gorica
12	GK	Roko Burger	20 June 2009 (age 17)	(Croatian Football Federation) Primorac
4	DF	Ante Beljan	9 May 2009 (age 17)	(Croatian Football Federation) Lokomotiva
5	DF	Karlo Zirdum	21 January 2009 (age 17)	(Croatian Football Federation) Dinamo Zagreb
14	DF	Vito Sablić	22 May 2010 (age 16)	(Croatian Football Federation) Lokomotiva
15	DF	Mateo Sabo	23 April 2009 (age 17)	(Croatian Football Federation) Osijek
3	DF	Filip Topić	23 March 2009 (age 17)	(German Football Association) Karlsruher SC
2	DF	Lovro Trupčević	23 May 2010 (age 16)	(Croatian Football Federation) Dinamo Zagreb
13	DF	Luka Posavec	15 April 2009 (age 17)	(Croatian Football Federation) Osijek
6	MF	Matej Miličić	21 September 2009 (age 17)	(Croatian Football Federation) Dinamo Zagreb
8	MF	Juraj Frigan	16 May 2009 (age 17)	(Croatian Football Federation) Gorica
10	MF	Jona Benkotić	20 March 2009 (age 17)	(Croatian Football Federation) Dinamo Zagreb
16	MF	Marin Modrić	5 August 2009 (age 17)	(Croatian Football Federation) Hajduk Split
18	MF	Dino Beader Trajanovski	29 January 2010 (age 16)	(Croatian Football Federation) Lokomotiva
17	MF	Rio Joka	10 March 2010 (age 16)	(Croatian Football Federation) Istra 1961
20	MF	Mihael Kelava	29 May 2009 (age 17)	(Croatian Football Federation) Gorica
11	FW	Nik Škafar Žužić	3 June 2009 (age 17)	(Croatian Football Federation) Istra 1961
7	FW	Luka Radić	6 February 2009 (age 17)	(Croatian Football Federation) Dinamo Zagreb
9	FW	Toni Ruso	4 January 2009 (age 17)	(Croatian Football Federation) Hajduk Split
19	FW	Jakov Dedić	27 August 2009 (age 17)	(Croatian Football Federation) Osijek

=== Recent call-ups ===
The following players have also been called up within the last twelve months and remain eligible for future selections.

Pos.	Player	Date of birth (age)	Caps	Goals	Club	Latest call-up

== Competitive record ==
Champions
Runners-up
Third place
Fourth place
Tournament played fully or partially on home soil

=== UEFA European Under-17 Championship record ===
Until the 1997 tournament, players born on or after 1 August the year they turned 17 years were eligible to compete. Since the 1998 tournament, the date limit has been moved back to 1 January. In 2001/2002 the competition was renamed the European Under-17 Championship, but the eligibility rules did not change.

UEFA European Under-17 Championship record										Qualifications record						
Year	Round	Position	Pld	W	D	L	GF	GA	Squad	GP	W	D	L	GF	GA	Year
(Italy) 1982	Part of Yugoslavia															
(West Germany) 1984	Part of Yugoslavia															
(Hungary) 1985	Part of Yugoslavia															
(Greece) 1986	Part of Yugoslavia															
(France) 1987	Part of Yugoslavia															
(Spain) 1988	Part of Yugoslavia															
(Denmark) 1989	Part of Yugoslavia															
(East Germany) 1990	Part of Yugoslavia															
(Switzerland) 1991	Part of Yugoslavia															
(Cyprus) 1992	Not a UEFA member															
(Turkey) 1993	Not a UEFA member															
(Republic of Ireland) 1994	Did not qualify									4	1	2	1	7	6	1994
(Belgium) 1995	Did not qualify									2	1	0	1	3	1	1995
(Austria) 1996	Quarter-finals	8/16	4	2	0	2	4	8	Squad	3	3	0	0	7	0	1996
(Germany) 1997	Did not qualify									2	1	1	0	2	1	1997
(Scotland) 1998	Quarter-finals	7/16	4	1	1	2	3	4	Squad	3	2	1	0	9	1	1998
(Czech Republic) 1999	Group stage	15/16	3	0	1	2	1	4	Squad	2	2	0	0	11	0	1999
(Israel) 2000	Did not qualify									3	1	1	1	3	4	2023
(England) 2001	Third place	3/16	6	4	0	2	9	7	Squad	2	2	0	0	7	1	2000
(Denmark) 2002	Did not qualify									3	2	1	0	8	3	2002
(Portugal) 2003	Did not qualify									6	4	0	2	14	7	2003
(France) 2004	Did not qualify									3	1	1	1	3	4	2004
(Italy) 2005	Fourth place	4/8	5	2	1	2	13	11	Squad	6	4	1	1	20	8	2005
(Luxembourg) 2006	Did not qualify									3	1	1	1	2	1	2006
(Belgium) 2007	Did not qualify									3	1	0	2	8	11	2007
(Turkey) 2008	Did not qualify									6	4	1	1	13	1	2008
(Germany) 2009	Did not qualify									6	5	0	1	11	4	2009
(Liechtenstein) 2010	Did not qualify									6	4	1	1	9	5	2010
(Serbia) 2011	Did not qualify									6	2	4	0	6	3	2011
(Slovenia) 2012	Did not qualify									3	1	0	2	5	6	2012
(Slovakia) 2013	Group stage	5/8	3	1	2	0	2	1	Squad	6	5	1	0	15	8	2013
(Malta) 2014	Did not qualify									3	1	0	2	1	3	2014
(Bulgaria) 2015	Quarter-finals	7/16	5	3	2	0	5	1	Squad	6	5	1	0	18	2	2015
(Azerbaijan) 2016	Did not qualify									6	2	1	3	11	11	2016
(Croatia) 2017	Group stage	14/16	3	0	1	2	2	6	Squad	Qualified as hosts						
(England) 2018	Did not qualify									6	2	3	1	10	4	2018
(Republic of Ireland) 2019	Did not qualify									6	3	2	1	10	6	2019
(Estonia) 2020	Tournament and elite qualifying round cancelled due to COVID-19 pandemic									3	3	0	0	9	3	2020
~~(Cyprus) 2021~~	Tournament and qualifying round cancelled due to COVID-19 pandemic															
(Israel) 2022	Did not qualify									3	1	0	2	3	2	2022
(Hungary) 2023	Group stage	12/16	3	0	1	2	2	4	Squad	6	3	2	1	6	5	2023
(Cyprus) 2024	Group stage	9/16	3	0	3	0	3	3	Squad	6	3	1	2	19	11	2024
(Albania) 2025	Did not qualify									6	4	0	2	16	6	2025
(Estonia) 2026	Group stage	TBD	3	2	0	1	6	5	Squad	6	4	1	1	15	7	2026
(Latvia) 2027	TBD									TBD						2027
Total:11/43	Third place	3rd	42	15	12	15	50	54		135	78	27	30	281	135	

Draws include knockout matches decided via penalty shoot-out; correct as of 9 November 2023 after the match against England.

Matches
First match	France 2–0 Croatia (Scheibbs, Austria; 29 April 1996)
Biggest win	Switzerland 2–5 Croatia (Santa Croce sull'Arno, Italy; 8 May 2005)
Biggest defeat	Portugal 5–1 Croatia (Krems an der Donau, Austria; 6 May 1996)

=== FIFA U-17 World Cup record ===
FIFA U-17 World Cup record										Qualifications record	
Year	Round	Position	GP	W	D*	L	GF	GA	Squad	Qualifications record	
(China) 1985	Part of Yugoslavia										
(Canada) 1987	Part of Yugoslavia										
(Scotland) 1989	Part of Yugoslavia										
(Italy) 1991	Part of Yugoslavia										
(Japan) 1993	Not a FIFA member										
(Ecuador) 1995	Did not qualify									UEFA European Under-17 Championship	1995
(Egypt) 1997	Did not qualify									UEFA European Under-17 Championship	1997
(New Zealand) 1999	Did not qualify									UEFA European Under-17 Championship	1999
(Trinidad and Tobago) 2001	Group stage	10th	3	1	0	2	3	8	Squad	UEFA European Under-17 Championship	2001
(Finland) 2003	Did not qualify									UEFA European Under-17 Championship	2003
(Peru) 2005	Did not qualify									UEFA European Under-17 Championship	2005
(South Korea) 2007	Did not qualify									UEFA European Under-17 Championship	2007
(Nigeria) 2009	Did not qualify									UEFA European Under-17 Championship	2009
(Mexico) 2011	Did not qualify									UEFA European Under-17 Championship	2011
(United Arab Emirates) 2013	Group stage	17th	3	1	0	2	3	5	Squad	UEFA European Under-17 Championship	2013
(Chile) 2015	Quarter-finals	7th	5	2	2	1	7	5	Squad	UEFA European Under-17 Championship	2015
(India) 2017	Did not qualify									UEFA European Under-17 Championship	2017
(Brazil) 2019	Did not qualify									UEFA European Under-17 Championship	2019
(Indonesia) 2023	Did not qualify									UEFA European Under-17 Championship	2023
(Qatar) 2025	Round 32	19th	4	2	2	0	7	2	Squad	UEFA European Under-17 Championship	2025
(Qatar) 2026	In progress	TBD	1	0	1	0	1	1	Squad	UEFA European Under-17 Championship	2026
Total:5/21	Quarter-finals	7th	16	6	5	5	21	21			

Draws include knockout matches decided via penalty shoot-out; correct as of 9 November 2025 after the match against Costa Rica.

Matches
First match	Trinidad and Tobago 1–2 Croatia (Port of Spain, Trinidad and Tobago; 13 September 2001)
Biggest win	United Arab Emirates 0–3 Croatia (Al Rayyan; 6 November 2025)
Biggest defeat	Croatia 0–4 Australia (Port of Spain, Trinidad and Tobago; 19 September 2001)

=== Telki Cup ===
Year	Round	Position	Pld	W	D	L	GF	GA
(Hungary) 2001 Telki Cup	Third	3rd	4	1	3	0	7	4
(Hungary) 2002 Telki Cup	Champions	1st	4	3	1	0	10	3
(Hungary) 2003 Telki Cup	Group stage	5th	3	1	0	2	3	5
(Hungary) 2004 Telki Cup	Group stage	6th	3	1	1	1	4	3
(Hungary) 2005 Telki Cup	Runners-up	2nd	4	2	2	0	7	4
(Hungary) 2006 Telki Cup	Sixth	6th	3	0	1	2	1	7
(Hungary) 2007 Telki Cup	Champions	1st	3	3	0	0	3	0
(Hungary) 2008 Telki Cup	Runners-up	2nd	3	2	1	0	6	2
(Hungary) 2009 Telki Cup	Seventh	7th	3	1	1	1	6	4
(Hungary) 2010 Telki Cup	Sixth	6th	3	1	0	2	4	4
(Hungary) 2011 Telki Cup	Semi-finals	4th	3	2	1	0	4	3
(Hungary) 2012 Telki Cup	Runners-up	2nd	3	1	1	1	6	4
(Hungary) 2013 Telki Cup	Third	3rd	3	2	0	1	4	3
(Hungary) 2015 Telki Cup	Runners-up	2nd	3	2	0	1	2	4
(Hungary) 2017 Telki Cup	Champions	1st	3	1	2	0	6	3
(Hungary) 2018 Telki Cup	Champions	1st	3	3	0	0	8	1
(Hungary) 2019 Telki Cup	Champions	1st	3	3	0	0	14	5
(Hungary) 2022 Telki Cup	Runners-up	2nd	3	1	2	0	10	5
(Hungary) 2023 Telki Cup	Champions	1st	3	3	0	0	8	2
Total	6 titles	19/19	60	33	16	11	113	66

Draws include knockout matches decided via penalty shoot-out; correct as of 19 August 2023 after the match against Uzbekistan.

== Past squads ==
- 1999 UEFA U-16 European Championship squad
- 2001 UEFA U-16 European Championship squad
- 2001 FIFA U-17 World Championship squad
- 2005 UEFA U-17 European Championship squad
- 2013 UEFA U-17 European Championship squad
- 2013 FIFA U-17 World Cup squad
- 2015 UEFA U-17 European Championship squad
- 2015 FIFA U-17 World Cup squad
- 2017 UEFA U-17 European Championship squad

== See also ==
- Croatia national football team
- Croatia national football B team
- Croatia national under-23 football team
- Croatia national under-21 football team
- Croatia national under-20 football team
- Croatia national under-19 football team
- Croatia national under-18 football team
- Croatia national under-16 football team
- Croatia national under-15 football team
- Croatia women's national football team
- Croatia women's national under-19 football team
- Croatia women's national under-17 football team
- Croatia women's national under-15 football team
