= Croatia national under-21 football team =

National association football team

Croatia U21
- Nickname: Mladi Vatreni (The Young Blazers)
- Association: Croatian Football Federation (HNS)
- Confederation: UEFA (Europe)
- Head coach: Ivica Olić
- Captain: Lovro Zvonarek
- Most caps: Luka Ivanušec (28)
- Top scorer: Tomislav Bušić (13)
- FIFA code: CRO
First colours	Second colours

First international
- Slovakia 1–1 Croatia (Bratislava, Slovakia, September 1942)

Biggest win
- Croatia 10–0 San Marino (Zagreb, Croatia, 8 October 2020)

Biggest defeat
- Spain 6–0 Croatia (Alicante, Spain, 10 September 2012)

UEFA U-21 Championship
- Appearances: 5 (first in 2000)
- Best result: Quarter-finals (2021)
- Website: hns-cff.hr

The Croatia national under-21 football team represents Croatia in international football matches for players 21 or under. It is governed by the Croatian Football Federation, the governing body for football in Croatia. It is a member of UEFA in Europe and FIFA in global competitions. The team's colours reference two national symbols: the Croatian checkerboard and the country's tricolour. They are colloquially referred to as the Mladi vatreni ('Young Blazers'). So far, the Mladi vatreni qualified for six UEFA European Under-21 Championships, namely in 2000, 2004, 2019, 2021, 2023 and 2027. Croatia was unable to pass the group stage until the 2021 Euro when it was eliminated in the quarter-finals, its greatest accomplishment in the European competition so far.

== Results and fixtures ==
The following is a list of match results in the last 12 months, as well as any future matches that have been scheduled.

Win Draw Loss Fixture

=== 2026 ===
31 March 2026 Euro 2027 qualif Gr H	Croatia	3–0	Turkey

== Coaching staff ==
=== Current coaching staff ===
Position	Name
Head coach	(Croatia) Ivica Olić
Assistant coaches	(Croatia) Ante Tomić (Croatia) Renato Pilipović (Croatia) Niko Kranjčar
Goalkeeping coach	(Croatia) Darko Staneković
Fitness coaches	(Croatia) Vedran Naglić (Croatia) Aris Naglić
Analyst	(Croatia) Nikola Buzadžić
Doctors	(Croatia) Mislav Rakić (Croatia) Boban Dangubić (Croatia) Nino Brajković
Physiotherapists	(Croatia) Tomislav Buljan
Technical secretary	(Croatia) Josip Tomaško
Kit men	(Croatia) Milan Vincek (Croatia) Luka Karlo

== Players ==
=== Current squad ===
The following players were named in the squad for the 2027 UEFA European Under-21 Championship qualification Group H matches against Hungary, Ukraine and Lithuania on 26 September, 2 and 6 October 2026; respectively.

Caps and goals correct as of 6 October 2026, after the match against Lithuania

No.	Pos.	Player	Date of birth (age)	Caps	Goals	Club
1	GK	Toni Silić	7 May 2004 (age 22)	8	0	(Croatian Football Federation) Hajduk Split
12	GK	Anthony Pavlešić	31 January 2006 (age 20)	6	0	(Football Association of the Czech Republic) Sigma Olomouc
23	GK	Luka Savatović	6 July 2004 (age 22)	2	0	(Croatian Football Federation) Lokomotiva
2	DF	Noel Bodetić	24 February 2004 (age 22)	2	0	(Croatian Football Federation) Rijeka
3	DF	Dominik Prpić	19 May 2004 (age 22)	16	1	(Portuguese Football Federation) Porto
4	DF	Branimir Mlačić	12 March 2007 (age 19)	4	1	(The Football Association) Watford
5	DF	Moreno Živković	22 May 2004 (age 22)	15	0	(Croatian Football Federation) Rijeka
13	DF	Niko Šepić	6 February 2006 (age 20)	1	0	(Croatian Football Federation) Istra 1961
14	DF	Raul Kumar	6 February 2008 (age 18)	1	0	(Croatian Football Federation) Istra 1961
18	DF	Luka Hodak	10 June 2006 (age 20)	4	0	(Croatian Football Federation) Hajduk Split
21	DF	Ivano Kolarik	20 May 2007 (age 19)	1	0	(Croatian Football Federation) Osijek
	DF	Šimun Hrgović	20 March 2004 (age 22)	17	0	(Croatian Football Federation) Hajduk Split
6	MF	Luka Vrbančić	4 July 2005 (age 21)	12	1	(Croatian Football Federation) Osijek
8	MF	Adriano Jagušić	6 September 2005 (age 21)	15	5	(Hellenic Football Federation) Panathinaikos
10	MF	Lovro Zvonarek	8 May 2005 (age 21)	25	2	(Portuguese Football Federation) Estrela Amadora
15	MF	Ivan Katić	25 September 2005 (age 21)	5	0	(Croatian Football Federation) Lokomotiva
16	MF	Branko Pavić	7 November 2006 (age 19)	5	0	(Croatian Football Federation) Rijeka
17	MF	Ivan Canjuga	30 November 2005 (age 20)	7	1	(Croatian Football Federation) Varaždin
22	MF	Filip Mažar	24 March 2005 (age 21)	4	0	(Croatian Football Federation) Slaven Belupo
	MF	Fabijan Krivak	24 February 2005 (age 21)	8	4	(Football Association of the Czech Republic) Sigma Olomouc
7	FW	Marin Šotiček	18 September 2004 (age 22)	22	3	(Croatian Football Federation) Hajduk Split
9	FW	Fran Topić	20 March 2004 (age 22)	14	3	(Croatian Football Federation) Dinamo Zagreb
11	FW	Adrian Segečić	1 June 2004 (age 22)	5	0	(The Football Association) Portsmouth
19	FW	Antonio Verinac	27 December 2004 (age 21)	3	0	(Austrian Football Association) Austria Lustenau
20	FW	Domagoj Bukvić	22 February 2004 (age 22)	17	1	(Croatian Football Federation) Osijek

=== Recent call-ups ===
The following players have also been called up to the squad in the last 12 months and are still eligible for selection.

Pos.	Player	Date of birth (age)	Caps	Goals	Club	Latest call-up
GK	Jozo Vukman	7 February 2004 (age 22)	0	0	(Croatia) Hrvace	v. Turkey, 31 March 2026
DF	Teo Barišić	30 September 2004 (age 22)	8	0	(Croatia) Rijeka	v. Turkey, 31 March 2026
DF	Filip Krušelj	30 March 2005 (age 21)	3	0	(Croatia) Slaven Belupo	v. Turkey, 31 March 2026
MF	Ante Kavelj	26 August 2005 (age 21)	6	0	(Croatia) Gorica	v. Turkey, 31 March 2026
MF	Šimun Mikolčić	21 January 2004 (age 22)	4	1	(Croatia) Osijek	v. Turkey, 31 March 2026
MF	Vito Čaić	1 April 2005 (age 21)	1	0	(Croatia) Vukovar 1991	v. Turkey, 31 March 2026
MF	Marin Prekodravac	3 March 2005 (age 21)	0	0	(Croatia) Šibenik	v. Georgia, 15 November 2024^{PRE}
MF	Šimun Mikolčić	21 January 2004 (age 22)	0	0	(Croatia) Osijek	v. Georgia, 15 November 2024^{PRE}
FW	Roko Brajković	3 July 2005 (age 21)	5	0	(Croatia) Hajduk Split	v. Turkey, 31 March 2026
FW	Anton Matković	19 February 2006 (age 20)	3	0	(Croatia) Osijek	v. Turkey, 31 March 2026
^{INJ} = Injured or ill.; ^{WD} = Withdrew.; ^{SUS} = Suspended from participating.; ^{RET} = Retired after latest call-up.; ^{SEN} = Joined the Croatia senior team instead.; ^{PRE} = Preliminary squad.

== Competitive record ==
Champions
Runners-up
Third place
Fourth place
Tournament played fully or partially on home soil

=== UEFA European Under-21 Championship ===
UEFA European Under-21 Championship record										Qualifications record							
Year	Round	Position	Pld	W	D	L	GF	GA	Squad	Position	Pld	W	D	L	GF	GA	Manager
1978	Part of Yugoslavia																
1980	Part of Yugoslavia																
1982	Part of Yugoslavia																
1984	Part of Yugoslavia																
1986	Part of Yugoslavia																
1988	Part of Yugoslavia																
1990	Part of Yugoslavia																
1992	Not a UEFA member																
(France) 1994	Not a UEFA member during qualifiers																
(Spain) 1996	Did not qualify									4/6	10	5	2	3	13	12	Martin Novoselac
(Romania) 1998	Did not qualify									3/5	8	4	0	4	13	9	Ivo Šušak
(Slovakia) 2000	Group stage	7/8	3	0	1	2	4	6	Squad	1/5	10	7	2	1	28	9	Ivo Šušak
(Switzerland) 2002	Did not qualify									2/4^{OFF}	8	3	4	1	10	7	Martin Novoselac
(Germany) 2004	Group stage	7/8	3	0	1	2	3	5	Squad	1/4	8	4	2	2	11	5	Martin Novoselac
(Portugal) 2006	Did not qualify									1/6^{OFF}	12	8	1	3	16	11	Slaven Bilić
(Netherlands) 2007	Did not qualify									3/3	2	0	0	2	2	4	Dražen Ladić
(Sweden) 2009	Did not qualify									2/6	10	7	1	2	20	12	Dražen Ladić
(Denmark) 2011	Did not qualify									1/5^{OFF}	10	5	2	3	18	15	Dražen Ladić
(Israel) 2013	Did not qualify									4/5	8	2	1	5	7	16	Ivo Šušak
(Czech Republic) 2015	Did not qualify									1/5^{OFF}	10	6	1	3	22	9	Niko Kovač / Nenad Gračan
(Poland) 2017	Did not qualify									3/6	10	6	2	2	24	11	Nenad Gračan
(Italy) 2019	Group stage	10/12	3	0	1	2	4	8	Squad	1/6	10	8	1	1	31	5	Nenad Gračan
(Hungary) (Slovenia) 2021	Quarter-finals	7/16	4	1	0	3	5	7	Squad 1 / Squad 2	2/6	10	6	2	2	37	7	Nenad Gračan/Igor Bišćan
(Romania) (Georgia (country)) 2023	Group stage	14/16	3	0	1	2	0	3	Squad	1/6	8	6	1	1	19	7	Igor Bišćan/Dragan Skočić
(Slovakia) 2025	Did not qualify									2/6^{OFF}	12	8	1	3	23	17	Dragan Skočić/Ivica Olić
(Albania) (Serbia) 2027	To be determined									To be determined							
Total	Quarter-finals	5/24	16	1	4	11	16	29			145	84	23	38	290	154	

Draws include knockout matches decided via penalty shoot-out; correct as of 20 November 2023 after the match against Belarus.

Matches
First match	Croatia 1–2 Netherlands (Trnava, Slovakia; 27 May 2000)
Biggest win	Croatia 3–2 Switzerland (Koper, Slovenia; 28 March 2021)
Biggest defeat	Romania 4–1 Croatia (Serravalle, San Marino; 18 June 2019)

Notes

- ^{OFF} = Lost in play-offs.

== Statistics ==
=== Managers ===
The following table provides a summary of the complete record of each manager including their results regarding European Under-21 Championship.

Key: Pld–games played, W–games won, D–games drawn; L–games lost, %–win percentage

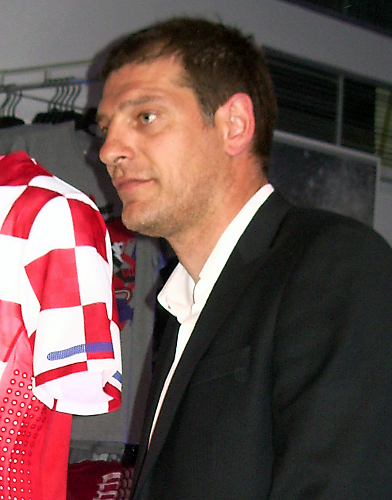
Bilić is one of two former U21 managers who later coached Croatia's senior team

Manager	Tenure	Pld	W	D	L	Win %	Tournaments
(Croatia) Martin Novoselac	1994–1996; 2000–2004	54	19	20	15	35.2	1996 European Championship – Failed to qualify 2002 European Championship – Failed to qualify 2004 European Championship – Group stage
(Croatia) Ivo Šušak	1997–2000; 2011–2013	38	18	6	14	47.4	1998 European Championship – Failed to qualify 2000 European Championship – Group stage 2013 European Championship – Failed to qualify
(Croatia) Slaven Bilić	2004–2006	20	11	3	6	55.0	2006 European Championship – Play-offs
(Croatia) Aljoša Asanović (c)	2005	1	0	0	1	0.0	2006 European Championship – Failed to qualify
(Croatia) Ivica Grnja (c)	2005	1	0	0	1	0.0	2006 European Championship – Failed to qualify
(Croatia) Marijan Brnčić (c)	2005	1	0	1	0	0.0	—
(Croatia) Dražen Ladić	2006–2011	32	20	6	6	62.50	2007 European Championship – Failed to qualify 2009 European Championship – Failed to qualify 2011 European Championship – Failed to qualify
(Croatia) Niko Kovač	2013	7	5	0	2	71.4	—
(Croatia) Nenad Gračan	2013–2019	41	21	9	11	51.2	2015 European Championship – Failed to qualify 2017 European Championship – Failed to qualify 2019 European Championship – Group stage
(Croatia) Igor Bišćan	2019–2023	30	18	5	7	60.0	2021 European Championship – Quarter-finals
(Croatia) Dragan Skočić	2023–	8	3	3	2	37.5	2023 European Championship – Group stage

Last updated: Croatia vs Belarus, 20 November 2023. Statistics include official FIFA-recognised matches only.

=== Most capped players ===
Players in bold are still active with Croatia.

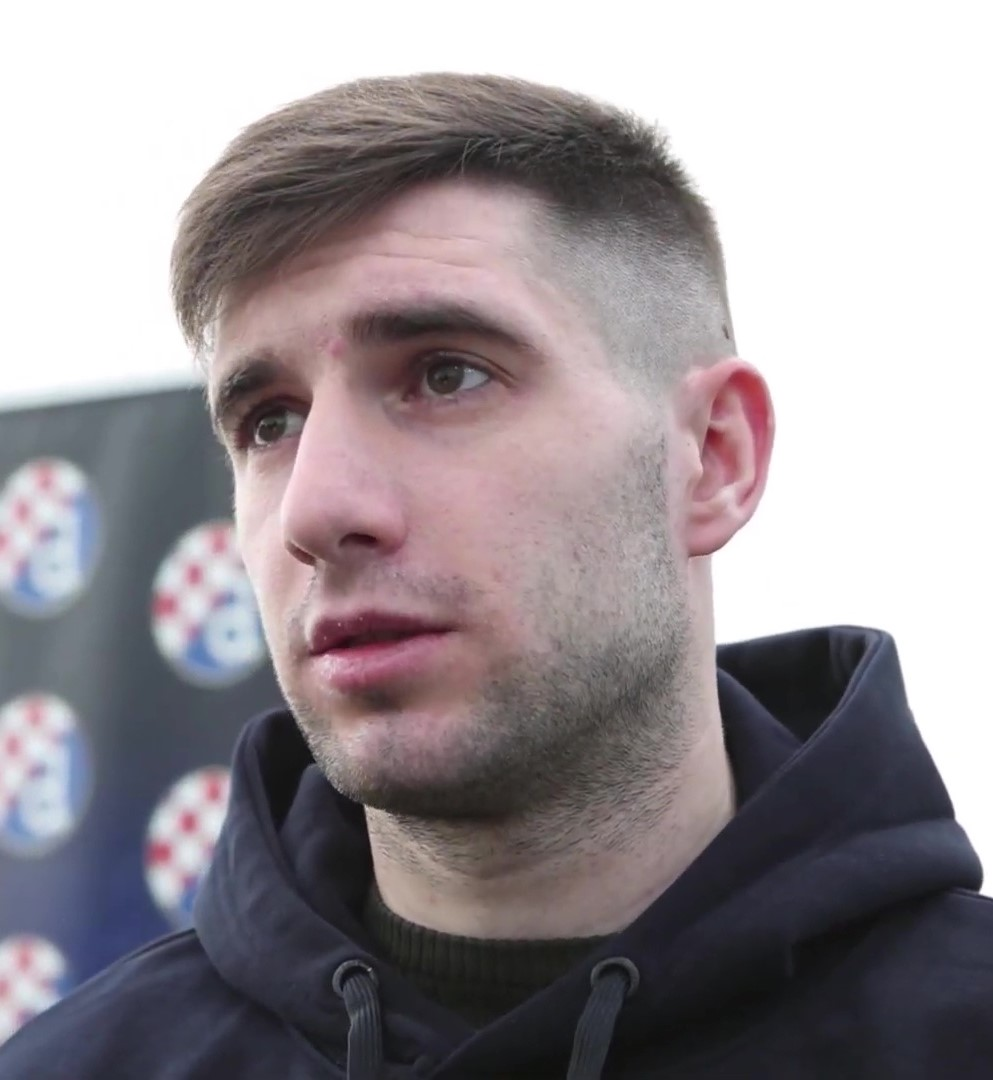
With 28 caps, Ivanušec is the most capped player of the U21 team

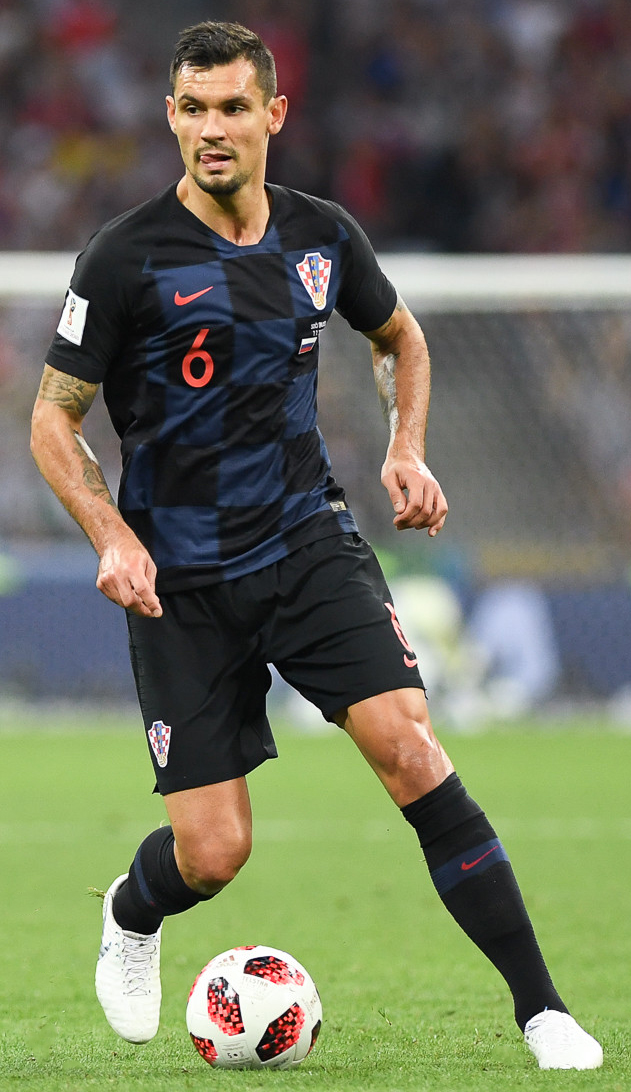
Before joining the senior team Lovren played 19 matches for the U21 team

#	Name	Career	Caps	Goals
1	Luka Ivanušec	2017–2021	28	10
2	Tomislav Vranjić	2002–2005	26	0
3	Tomislav Bušić	2005–2008	25	12
4	Nikola Moro	2017–2021	24	6
5	Josip Tadić	2005–2008	22	5
6	Ivan Leko	1994–2000	21	5
6	Mato Jajalo	2007–2010	21	4
8	Tomo Šokota	1997–2000	19	10
8	**Roko Šimić**	2021–	19	8
8	Nikola Vlašić	2015–2019	19	7
8	Lovro Majer	2017–2021	19	5
8	Davor Vugrinec	1994–1997	19	3
8	Dejan Lovren	2007–2010	19	3
8	Mario Lučić	2002–2004	19	2
8	Domagoj Vida	2007–2010	19	2
8	Dario Smoje	1997–2000	19	1
8	Boško Šutalo	2019–2022	19	1
8	Mario Carević	2001–2004	19	0
8	Luka Vučko	2004–2006	19	0
8	Borna Sosa	2017–2020	19	0

Last updated: Belarus vs Croatia, 20 November 2023

Source: Croatian Football Federation

=== Top goalscorers ===
Players in bold are still active with Croatia.

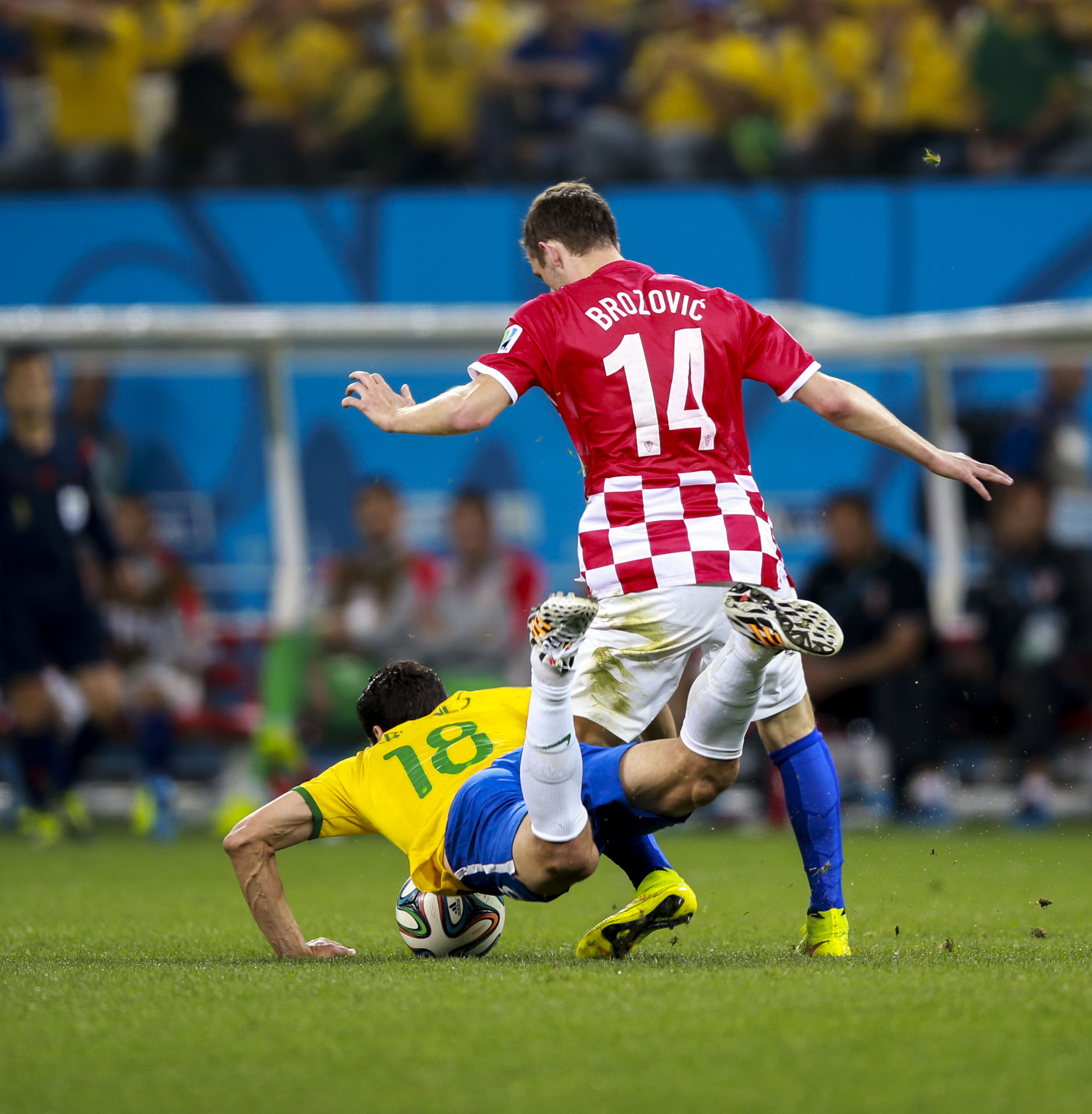
Brozović scored 7 goals for the U21 team before he was promoted to the senior team

#	Name	Goals	Caps	Ratio	Career
1	Tomislav Bušić	12	29	0.41	2005–2008
2	Tomo Šokota	10	19	0.53	1997–2000
2	Luka Ivanušec	10	28	0.36	2017–2021
4	Josip Brekalo	9	17	0.53	2016–2019
5	Eduardo da Silva	8	12	0.67	2004–2005
5	Stipe Perica	8	12	0.67	2013–2016
5	**Roko Šimić**	8	19	0.42	2021–
8	Marcelo Brozović	7	13	0.54	2011–2014
8	Nikola Vlašić	7	19	0.37	2015–2019
10	Ante Rukavina	6	9	0.67	2007–2008
10	**Marin Ljubičić**	6	11	0.55	2021–
10	Mario Pašalić	6	14	0.43	2014–2016
10	Mihael Mikić	6	15	0.4	1999–2001
10	Sandro Kulenović	6	15	0.4	2019–2021
10	Nikola Moro	6	24	0.25	2017–2021

Last updated: Belarus vs Croatia, 20 November 2023

Source: Croatian Football Federation

== Record per opponent ==
More wins than losses
As many wins as losses
Fewer wins than losses

Correct as of 6 June 2026, after the match against the Republic of Ireland.

Opponent	Pld	W	D	L	GF	GA	GD	Win %
Albania	2	1	0	1	4	1	+3	50.00
Andorra	2	2	0	0	5	0	+5	100.00
Australia U23	2	0	0	2	1	5	−4	0.00
Austria	4	1	3	0	5	3	+2	25.00
Azerbaijan	4	4	0	0	11	3	+8	100.00
Belarus	5	4	1	0	10	2	+8	80.00
Belgium	4	2	1	1	5	3	+2	50.00
Bosnia and Herzegovina	9	4	3	2	19	14	+5	44.44
Bulgaria	6	2	1	3	6	6	+0	33.33
Chile U23	1	0	0	1	0	1	−1	0.00
Cyprus	2	1	0	1	2	3	−1	50.00
Czech Republic	7	1	3	3	11	10	+1	14.29
Denmark	6	4	0	2	8	5	+3	66.67
Egypt U20	1	1	0	0	3	2	+1	100.00
England	7	3	1	3	12	10	+2	42.86
Estonia	10	9	1	0	23	3	+20	90.00
Faroe Islands	4	4	0	0	10	4	+6	100.00
Finland	2	1	0	1	4	3	+1	50.00
France	5	0	1	4	3	8	−5	0.00
Georgia	6	2	2	2	7	7	+0	33.33
Germany	1	1	0	0	2	0	+2	100.00
Greece	13	7	4	2	26	16	+10	53.85
Hungary	13	8	4	1	32	14	+18	61.54
Iceland	2	2	0	0	4	2	+2	100.00
Israel	5	0	2	3	0	5	−5	0.00
Italy	10	1	6	3	11	14	−3	10.00
Italy B	2	0	2	0	1	1	+0	0.00
Latvia	4	2	2	0	7	3	+4	50.00
Liechtenstein	2	2	0	0	9	0	+9	100.00
Lithuania	5	5	0	0	17	1	+16	100.00
Malta	4	4	0	0	6	0	+6	100.00
Morocco U20	1	0	0	1	0	4	−4	0.00
Mexico	1	0	0	1	0	1	−1	0.00
Moldova	2	2	0	0	7	0	+7	100.00
Montenegro	3	1	2	0	4	2	+2	33.33
Netherlands	2	1	0	1	4	4	+0	50.00
North Macedonia	4	3	1	0	8	1	+7	75.00
Norway	5	4	0	1	15	7	+8	80.00
Poland	3	1	2	0	4	2	+2	33.33
Portugal	6	1	0	5	4	12	−8	16.67
Qatar U23	2	2	0	0	5	1	+4	100.00
Republic of Ireland	5	2	2	1	12	8	+4	40.00
Romania	2	0	1	1	1	4	−3	0.00
Russia	1	0	0	1	3	4	−1	0.00
San Marino	6	6	0	0	33	0	+33	100.00
Scotland	6	2	2	2	9	7	+2	33.33
Serbia	7	2	2	3	17	15	+2	28.57
Slovakia	10	4	5	1	16	11	+5	40.00
Slovenia	12	7	1	4	22	13	+9	58.33
Spain	9	1	1	7	7	19	−12	11.11
Sweden	8	3	2	3	12	13	−1	37.50
Switzerland	5	2	0	3	6	10	−4	40.00
Thailand U23	1	1	0	0	3	1	+2	100.00
Togo U23	1	1	0	0	1	0	+1	100.00
Turkey	4	1	3	0	4	1	+3	25.00
Ukraine	8	3	2	3	8	8	+0	37.50
United Arab Emirates U23	1	1	0	0	3	0	+3	100.00
Total: 57 teams played	262	127	62	73	472	297	+175	48.47

Source: Croatian Football Federation

== See also ==
- Croatia national football team
- Croatia national football B team
- Croatia national under-23 football team
- Croatia national under-20 football team
- Croatia national under-19 football team
- Croatia national under-18 football team
- Croatia national under-17 football team
- Croatia national under-16 football team
- Croatia national under-15 football team
- Croatia women's national football team
- Croatia women's national under-19 football team
- Croatia women's national under-17 football team
- Croatia women's national under-15 football team
