= Croatia women's national under-17 football team =

National association football team

Croatia Women's U17
- Association: HNS
- Confederation: UEFA (Europe)
- Head coach: Božidar Miletić
- Most caps: Mia Pestić (19) Lana Lovrić (19)
- Top scorer: Marija Došen (9)
- FIFA code: CRO
First colours	Second colours

First international
- Slovenia 1–2 Croatia (Krško, Slovenia; 10 April 2007)

Biggest win
- Croatia 8–0 Malta (Karlovac, Croatia; 2 October 2023) Croatia 8–0 Azerbaijan (Karlovac, Croatia; 5 October 2023)

Biggest defeat
- England 13–0 Croatia (Rakvere, Estonia; 1 October 2015)

UEFA Women's Under-17 Championship
- Appearances: 0
- Website: hns-cff.hr

The Croatia women's national under-17 football team represents Croatia in international women's football matches for players aged 17 or under. It is governed by the Croatian Football Federation, the governing body for football in Croatia. It is a member of UEFA in Europe and FIFA in global competitions. The team's colours reference two national symbols: the Croatian checkerboard and the country's tricolour. They are colloquially referred to as the Lavice ('Lionesses'). So far, the Lavice have not qualified for UEFA Women's Under-17 Championship, and consequently for FIFA U-17 Women's World Cup, as the European Championship serves as the qualifier for the World Cup.

== Competitive record ==
Champions
Runners-up
Third place
Fourth place
Tournament played fully or partially on home soil

=== FIFA U-17 Women's World Cup record ===
The tournament is held biannually. Croatia's women's under-17 team never managed to qualify for the World Cup.

Summer Olympic Games record										Qualifications record	
Year	Round	Position	GP	W	D*	L	GF	GA	Squad	Qualifications record	
(New Zealand) 2008	Did not qualify									UEFA Women's Under-17 Championship	2008
(Trinidad and Tobago) 2010	Did not qualify									UEFA Women's Under-17 Championship	2010
(Azerbaijan) 2012	Did not qualify									UEFA Women's Under-17 Championship	2012
(Costa Rica) 2014	Did not qualify									UEFA Women's Under-17 Championship	2014
(Jordan) 2016	Did not qualify									UEFA Women's Under-17 Championship	2016
(Uruguay) 2018	Did not qualify									UEFA Women's Under-17 Championship	2018
(India) 2022	Did not qualify									UEFA Women's Under-17 Championship	2022
(Dominican Republic) 2024	Did not qualify									UEFA Women's Under-17 Championship	2024
(Morocco) 2025	Did not qualify									UEFA Women's Under-17 Championship	2025
Total	0/9										

Matches
First match	—
Biggest win	—
Biggest defeat	—

=== UEFA Women's Under-17 Championship record ===
Croatia women's under-17 team took part in the qualification for the European Under-17 Championship since its inception in 2008. The tournament is held every year and serves as the qualifying tournament for FIFA U-17 Women's World Cup which is held every two years.

Croatia's women's under-17 team never managed to qualify for the European Championship.

UEFA Women's Championship record										Qualification record						
Year	Round	Position	Pld	W	D	L	GF	GA	Squad	Pos	Pld	W	D	L	GF	GA
(Switzerland) 2008	Did not qualify									4/4	3	0	1	2	0	10
(Switzerland) 2009	Did not qualify									3/4	3	0	1	2	1	5
(Switzerland) 2010	Did not qualify									3/4	3	1	0	2	4	7
(Switzerland) 2011	Did not qualify									3/4	3	0	1	2	2	9
(Switzerland) 2012	Did not qualify									3/4	3	0	1	2	2	12
(Switzerland) 2013	Did not qualify									4/4	3	0	0	3	0	25
(England) 2014	Did not qualify									3/4	3	1	0	2	4	8
(Iceland) 2015	Did not qualify									3/4	3	1	0	2	3	8
(Belarus) 2016	Did not qualify									3/4	3	0	1	2	0	18
(Czech Republic) 2017	Did not qualify									3/4	3	1	0	2	3	8
(Lithuania) 2018	Did not qualify									4/4	3	0	0	3	1	15
(Bulgaria) 2019	Did not qualify									3/4	3	1	0	2	1	5
(Sweden) 2020	Tournament and elite qualifying round cancelled due to COVID-19 pandemic									4/4	3	1	0	2	1	3
(Faroe Islands) 2021	Tournament and elite qualifying round cancelled due to COVID-19 pandemic															
(Bosnia and Herzegovina) 2022	Did not qualify									4/4	6	3	0	3	14	18
(Estonia) 2023	Did not qualify									4/4	5	2	1	2	8	8
(Sweden) 2024	Did not qualify									1/4	3	3	0	0	19	0
(Faroe Islands) 2025	Did not qualify															
(Northern Ireland) 2026	To be determined															
(Finland) 2027	To be determined															
Total		0/15							—	0/15	53	14	6	33	63	159

Draws include knockout matches decided via penalty shoot-out; correct as of 5 October 2023 after the match against Azerbaijan.

Matches
First match	–
Biggest win	–
Biggest defeat	–

== See also ==
- Croatia women's national football team
- Croatia women's national under-19 football team
- Croatia women's national under-15 football team
- Croatia national football team
- Croatia national football B team
- Croatia national under-23 football team
- Croatia national under-21 football team
- Croatia national under-20 football team
- Croatia national under-19 football team
- Croatia national under-18 football team
- Croatia national under-17 football team
- Croatia national under-16 football team
- Croatia national under-15 football team
