= Croatia women's national under-15 football team =

Croatia Women's U15
- Association: HNS
- Confederation: UEFA (Europe)
- Head coach: Božidar Miletić
- Most caps: Ema Čikvar (9)
- Top scorer: Lorena Tomašić (7)
- FIFA code: CRO
First colours	Second colours

First international
- Slovenia 4–0 Croatia (Slovenia; 28 October 2015)

Biggest win
- Croatia 11–0 Slovenia (Zagreb, Croatia; 29 August 2024)

Biggest defeat
- Slovenia 4–0 Croatia (Slovenia; 28 October 2015)
- Website: hns-cff.hr

The Croatia women's national under-15 football team represents Croatia in international women's football matches for players aged 15 or under. It is governed by the Croatian Football Federation, the governing body for football in Croatia. It is a member of UEFA in Europe and FIFA in global competitions. The team's colours reference two national symbols: the Croatian checkerboard and the country's tricolour. They are colloquially referred to as the Lavice ('Lionesses'). The Lavice compete in the UEFA Under-15 Development Tournament.

== See also ==
- Croatia women's national football team
- Croatia women's national under-19 football team
- Croatia women's national under-17 football team
- Croatia national football team
- Croatia national football B team
- Croatia national under-23 football team
- Croatia national under-21 football team
- Croatia national under-20 football team
- Croatia national under-19 football team
- Croatia national under-18 football team
- Croatia national under-17 football team
- Croatia national under-16 football team
- Croatia national under-15 football team
