= Croatia national under-16 football team =

National association football team

Croatia U16
- Nickname: Mladi Vatreni (The Young Blazers)
- Association: Croatian Football Federation (HNS)
- Confederation: UEFA (Europe)
- Head coach: Robert Jarni
- Most caps: Domagoj Pavičić (15) Josip Šutalo (15)
- Top scorer: Teo Kardum (9)
- FIFA code: CRO
First colours	Second colours

First international
- Slovenia 0–0 Croatia (Brežice, Slovenia; 6 April 1993)

Biggest win
- Croatia 7–1 Slovenia (Rovinj, Croatia; 5 March 2002) Croatia 6–0 Hungary (Belišće, Croatia; 16 April 2002)

Biggest defeat
- Austria 4–0 Croatia (Villach, Austria; 24 May 2000) Croatia 1–5 Russia (Stara Pazova, Serbia; 2 June 2015)
- Website: hns-cff.hr

The Croatia national under-16 football team represents Croatia in international football matches for players aged 16 or younger. It is governed by the Croatian Football Federation, the governing body for football in Croatia. It is a member of UEFA in Europe and FIFA in global competitions. The team's colours reference two national symbols: the Croatian checkerboard and the country's tricolour. They are colloquially referred to as the Mali vatreni ('Little Blazers'). The Mali vatreni participate in the UEFA Under-16 Development Tournaments which are organised annually in several UEFA member countries. Croatia won four of the Development Tournaments: 2014 in Switzerland, 2018 in Bosnia and Herzegovina and 2019 and 2022 at home in Croatia.

== Recent results ==
The following is a list of match results from the last 12 months, along with any future matches scheduled.

Win Draw Loss Fixture

== Players ==
=== Current squad ===
The following players were called up for the summer camp in Stubičke Toplice from 4 to 9 August 2023.

No.	Pos.	Player	Date of birth (age)	Caps	Goals	Club
	GK	Matej Grahovac	26 March 2008 (age 18)	0	0	(Croatian Football Federation) Osijek
	GK	Luka Miočić	11 December 2008 (age 17)	0	0	(Croatian Football Federation) Zadar
	GK	Petar Nemet	15 July 2008 (age 18)	0	0	(Croatian Football Federation) Istra 1961
	GK	Ivan Pocrnjić	10 July 2008 (age 18)	0	0	(Croatian Football Federation) Solin
	DF	Antonio Beidenegl	8 December 2008 (age 17)	0	0	(Croatian Football Federation) Hajduk
	DF	Luka Bura	25 March 2008 (age 18)	0	0	(Croatian Football Federation) Lokomotiva Zagreb
	DF	Mateo Čupić	4 May 2008 (age 18)	0	0	(Croatian Football Federation) Hajduk
	DF	Leon Jakirović	16 January 2008 (age 18)	0	0	(Croatian Football Federation) Dinamo Zagreb
	DF	Petar Zvonimir Kostelac	17 March 2008 (age 18)	0	0	(Croatian Football Federation) Lokomotiva Zagreb
	DF	Raul Kumar	6 February 2008 (age 18)	0	0	(Croatian Football Federation) Istra 1961
	DF	Matej Medaković	25 November 2008 (age 17)	0	0	(Croatian Football Federation) Osijek
	DF	Lukas Murica	25 November 2008 (age 17)	0	0	(Croatian Football Federation) Rijeka
	DF	Karlo Pajsar	7 March 2008 (age 18)	0	0	(Croatian Football Federation) Dinamo Zagreb
	DF	Nikola Radnić	10 June 2008 (age 18)	0	0	(Croatian Football Federation) Dinamo Zagreb
	MF	Davor Bistre	31 March 2008 (age 18)	0	0	(Croatian Football Federation) Hajduk
	MF	Filip Bokan	29 April 2008 (age 18)	0	0	(Croatian Football Federation) Hajduk
	MF	Patrik Horvat	10 May 2008 (age 18)	0	0	(Croatian Football Federation) Dinamo Zagreb
	MF	Silvio Ivanišević Dvornik	28 September 2008 (age 18)	0	0	(Croatian Football Federation) Hajduk
	MF	Jona Ježić	8 October 2008 (age 18)	0	0	(Croatian Football Federation) Osijek
	MF	Matija Kablar	31 August 2008 (age 18)	0	0	(Croatian Football Federation) Istra 1961
	MF	Pavle Smiljanić	8 May 2008 (age 18)	0	0	(Croatian Football Federation) Lokomotiva Zagreb
	MF	Tin Vragolović	19 October 2008 (age 18)	0	0	(Croatian Football Federation) Osijek
	FW	Tin Bojadžija	13 August 2008 (age 18)	0	0	(Croatian Football Federation) Lokomotiva Zagreb
	FW	Luka Hrvojević	7 August 2008 (age 18)	0	0	(Croatian Football Federation) Dinamo Zagreb
	FW	Dražen Jaman	16 January 2008 (age 18)	0	0	(Croatian Football Federation) Osijek
	FW	Roko Lerga	10 January 2008 (age 18)	0	0	(Croatian Football Federation) Rijeka
	FW	Bruno Mišura	16 August 2008 (age 18)	0	0	(Croatian Football Federation) Hajduk
	FW	Frano Mohorovičić	30 April 2008 (age 18)	0	0	(Croatian Football Federation) Rijeka
	FW	Toma Šimunić	17 March 2008 (age 18)	0	0	(Croatian Football Federation) Rijeka

== Competitive record ==
Champions
Runners-up
Third place
Fourth place
Tournament played fully or partially on home soil

=== UEFA Under-16 Development Tournament record ===
Year	Round	Position	Pld	W	D	L	GF	GA
(Croatia) 2013 UEFA Under-16 Development Tournament	Runners-up	2nd	3	1	2	0	3	1
(Switzerland) 2014 UEFA Under-16 Development Tournament	Champions	1st	3	2	1	0	5	3
(Croatia) 2015 UEFA Under-16 Development Tournament	Third	3rd	3	2	0	1	3	4
(Bulgaria) 2016 UEFA Under-16 Development Tournament	Runners-up	2nd	3	2	0	1	5	3
(Scotland) 2017 UEFA Under-16 Development Tournament	Last	4th	3	0	1	2	1	3
(Bosnia and Herzegovina) 2018 UEFA Under-16 Development Tournament	Champions	1st	3	2	1	0	4	1
(Croatia) 2019 UEFA Under-16 Development Tournament	Champions	1st	3	2	1	0	10	4
(Croatia) 2022 UEFA Under-16 Development Tournament	Champions	1st	3	3	0	0	10	5
(Croatia) 2023 UEFA Under-16 Development Tournament	Runners-up	2nd	3	2	0	1	4	5
Total	4 titles	9/10	27	16	6	5	45	29

Draws include matches decided via penalty shoot-out; correct as of 24 April 2023 after the match against Austria.

Matches
First match	Croatia 2–0 Macedonia (Umag, Croatia; 11 March 2013)
Biggest win	Bolivia 0–5 Croatia (Karlovac, Croatia; 7 April 2019)
Biggest defeat	Croatia 1–4 Austria (Kotoriba, Croatia; 24 April 2023)

=== Other ===
Year	Round	Position	Pld	W	D	L	GF	GA
(Hungary) 1999 Telki Cup	Last	8th	4	1	0	3	2	8
(Hungary) 2000 Telki Cup	Seventh	7th	4	2	0	2	9	7
(France) 2012 Tournoi du Val-de-Marne	Third	3rd	3	1	1	1	3	3
(Serbia) 2015 Miljan Miljanić International Tournament	Third	3rd	3	0	2	1	2	6
(Serbia) 2016 Miljan Miljanić International Tournament	Champions	1st	3	2	1	0	6	3
(Croatia) 2020 Four Nations Tournament	Last	4th	3	0	1	2	3	6
(Croatia) 2020 Vlatko Marković International Tournament	Champions	1st	4	4	0	0	10	0
Total	2 titles	6/6	24	10	5	9	35	33

Correct as of 27 September 2020 after the match against Romania.

== See also ==
- Croatia national football team
- Croatia national football B team
- Croatia national under-23 football team
- Croatia national under-21 football team
- Croatia national under-20 football team
- Croatia national under-19 football team
- Croatia national under-18 football team
- Croatia national under-17 football team
- Croatia national under-15 football team
- Croatia women's national football team
- Croatia women's national under-19 football team
- Croatia women's national under-17 football team
- Croatia women's national under-15 football team
