= Croatia national football B team =

National association football B team

Croatia B
- Association: HNS
- Confederation: UEFA (Europe)
- Head coach: Mirko Jozić
- Most caps: Nino Bule (2) Mario Cvitanović (2)
- Top scorer: Dalibor Filipović (1) Goran Vlaović (1) Igor Tudor (1)
- FIFA code: CRO
First colours	Second colours

First international
- Italy 3–1 Croatia (Venice, Italy; 13 February 1993)

Biggest defeat
- Italy 3–1 Croatia (Venice, Italy; 13 February 1993) France 2–0 Croatia (Nimes, France; 19 January 1999)
- Website: hns-cff.hr

The Croatia national football B team represents Croatia in international football matches as a secondary team for the Croatia national football team. It is governed by the Croatian Football Federation, the governing body for football in Croatia. The team's colours reference two national symbols: the Croatian checkerboard and the country's tricolour.

Croatia's B team has played three matches so far, all of which were friendlies against other nations B teams. Its first match, played in 1993 against Italy ended in a 3–1 defeat. Croatia's B team then played against France in 1999, losing 2–0. In 2001, they met with Romania in a game that ended in a 2–2 draw. This is, so far, the last match played by Croatia's B team.

== Results ==
13 February 1993 Friendly	Italy	3–1	Croatia	Venice, Italy
	Cherubini 15'; Lamacchi 57'; Iuliano 73'	Report	Filipović 87'	Stadium: Stadio Pier Luigi Penzo; Attendance: 5,000; Referee: Robert Sedlacek (Austria)

19 January 1999 Friendly	France	2–0	Croatia	Nimes, France
	Laigle 64'; Née 70'	Report		Stadium: Stade des Costières; Attendance: 15,000; Referee: Jorge Emanuel Monteiro Coroado (Portugal)

30 January 2001 Friendly	Croatia	2–2	Romania	Pula, Croatia
	Vlaović 50'; Tudor 67'	Report	Mara 77'; Mutu 85'	Stadium: Stadion Aldo Drosina; Attendance: 2,500; Referee: Srečko Kandare (Slovenia)

== See also ==
- Croatia national football team
- Croatia national under-23 football team
- Croatia national under-21 football team
- Croatia national under-20 football team
- Croatia national under-19 football team
- Croatia national under-18 football team
- Croatia national under-17 football team
- Croatia national under-16 football team
- Croatia national under-15 football team
- Croatia women's national football team
- Croatia women's national under-19 football team
- Croatia women's national under-17 football team
- Croatia women's national under-15 football team
