= Ante Kavelj =

Croatian footballer

Personal information
- Date of birth: 26 August 2005 (age 21)
- Place of birth: Split, Croatia
- Height: 1.86 m (6 ft 1 in)
- Position: Midfielder

Team information
- Current team: Gorica
- Number: 36

Youth career
- 2017–2021: Split
- 2021–2023: Hajduk Split

Senior career*
Years	Team	Apps	(Gls)
2023–2024	Hajduk Split	0	(0)
2023–2024	→ Solin (loan)	14	(0)
2024–2025	Šibenik	23	(1)
2025–	Gorica	36	(3)

International career^{‡}
2023–2024	Croatia U19	7	(0)
2025	Croatia U20	1	(0)
2025–	Croatia U21	5	(0)
- * Club domestic league appearances and goals as of 15 June 2026 ‡ National team caps and goals as of 19 December 2025

Ante Kavelj (born 26 August 2005) is a Croatian professional footballer who plays as a midfielder for Prva HNL side Gorica.

== Club career ==
Kavelj joined Gorica after one season with Šibenik in the summer of 2025.

== International career ==
Kavelj has been capped for various Croatian youth national teams.
