= Croatia women's national under-19 football team =

Croatia Women's U19
- Association: HNS
- Confederation: UEFA (Europe)
- Head coach: Jure Srzić Branka Juhas
- Most caps: Petra Mikulica (23)
- Top scorer: Paula Petković (12)
- FIFA code: CRO
First colours	Second colours

First international
- Croatia 4–2 Slovenia (Zabok, Croatia; 24 August 2004)

Biggest win
- Croatia 7–0 Georgia (Albena, Bulgaria; 28 October 2023)

Biggest defeat
- Germany 10–0 Croatia (Jessheim, Norway; 8 April 2023)

UEFA Women's Under-19 Championship
- Appearances: 0
- Website: hns-cff.hr

The Croatia women's national under-19 football team represents Croatia in international women's football matches for players aged 19 or under. It is governed by the Croatian Football Federation, the governing body for football in Croatia. It is a member of UEFA in Europe and FIFA in global competitions. The team's colours reference two national symbols: the Croatian checkerboard and the country's tricolour. They are colloquially referred to as the Lavice ('Lionesses'). So far, the Lavice have not qualified for UEFA Women's Under-19 Championship, and consequently for FIFA U-20 Women's World Cup, as the European Championship serves as the qualifier for the World Cup.

== Competition history ==
Champions
Runners-up
Third place
Fourth place
Tournament played fully or partially on home soil

=== UEFA Women's Under-19 Championship record ===
The first continental competition Croatia women's under-19 team took part in was the qualification for the 2005 European Under-19 Championship. The tournament is held every year and serves as the qualifying tournament for FIFA U-20 Women's World Cup which is held every two years.

Croatia's women's under-19 team never managed to qualify for the European Championship.

UEFA Women's Championship record										Qualification record						
Year	Round	Position	Pld	W	D	L	GF	GA	Squad	Pos	Pld	W	D	L	GF	GA
(Hungary) 2005	Did not qualify										3	0	1	2	0	10
(Switzerland) 2006	Did not qualify										3	0	1	2	1	5
(Iceland) 2007	Did not qualify										3	1	0	2	4	7
(France) 2008	Did not qualify										3	0	1	2	2	9
(Belarus) 2009	Did not qualify										3	0	1	2	2	12
(North Macedonia) 2010	Did not qualify										3	0	0	3	0	25
(Italy) 2011	Did not qualify										3	1	0	2	4	8
(Turkey) 2012	Did not qualify										3	1	0	2	3	8
(Wales) 2013	Did not qualify										3	0	1	2	0	18
(Norway) 2014	Did not qualify									3/4	6	2	2	2	9	9
(Israel) 2015	Did not qualify									3/4	3	1	0	2	3	10
(Slovakia) 2016	Did not qualify									3/4	3	1	0	2	4	8
(Northern Ireland) 2017	Did not qualify									3/4	3	1	0	2	2	17
(Switzerland) 2018	Did not qualify									4/4	3	1	0	2	1	11
(Scotland) 2019	Did not qualify									4/4	3	0	1	2	0	14
(Georgia (country)) 2020	Tournament and elite qualifying round cancelled due to COVID-19 pandemic									3/4	3	0	2	1	0	2
(Belarus) 2021	Tournament and elite qualifying round cancelled due to COVID-19 pandemic															
(Czech Republic) 2022	Did not qualify									4/4	6	3	0	3	6	13
(Belgium) 2023	Did not qualify									4/4	6	3	0	3	9	16
(Lithuania) 2024	Did not qualify									1/4	3	3	0	0	15	2
(Poland) 2025	Did not qualify									1/4	6	5	0	1	16	1
(Bosnia and Herzegovina) 2026	Did not qualify									TBD	TBD					
Total		0/15							—	0/15	78	29	6	43	102	191

Draws include knockout matches decided via penalty shoot-out; correct as of 31 October 2023 after the match against Bulgaria.

Matches
First match	–
Biggest win	–
Biggest defeat	–

== See also ==
- Croatia women's national football team
- Croatia women's national under-17 football team
- Croatia women's national under-15 football team
- Croatia national football team
- Croatia national football B team
- Croatia national under-23 football team
- Croatia national under-21 football team
- Croatia national under-20 football team
- Croatia national under-19 football team
- Croatia national under-18 football team
- Croatia national under-17 football team
- Croatia national under-16 football team
- Croatia national under-15 football team
