= Croatia national under-20 football team =

Croatian football team

Croatia U20
- Nickname: Mladi Vatreni (The Young Blazers)
- Association: Croatian Football Federation (HNS)
- Confederation: UEFA (Europe)
- Head coach: Mladen Ivančić Sergej Milivojević
- Most caps: Alen Maras (14)
- Top scorer: Ahmad Sharbini (7)
- FIFA code: CRO
First colours	Second colours

First international
- Slovenia 0–1 Croatia (Brežice, Slovenia; 22 September 1994)

Biggest win
- Hungary 0–6 Croatia (Hungary; 5 September 1995) Croatia 6-0 Italy (Umag, Croatia; 15 March 2006)

Biggest defeat
- Brazil 4–0 Croatia (Calabar, Nigeria; 14 April 1999) Slovenia 4–0 Croatia (Brežice, Slovenia; 4 April 2006) Croatia 0–4 Serbia (Županja, Croatia; 22 May 2012)

FIFA U-20 World Cup
- Appearances: 3 (first in 1999)
- Best result: Round of 16 (1999, 2013)
- Website: hns-cff.hr

The Croatia national under-20 football team represents Croatia in international football matches for players aged 20 or under. It is governed by the Croatian Football Federation, the governing body for football in Croatia. It is a member of UEFA in Europe and FIFA in global competitions. The team's colours reference two national symbols: the Croatian checkerboard and the country's tricolour. They are colloquially referred to as the Mladi vatreni ('Young Blazers'). So far, the Mladi vatreni qualified for three FIFA U-20 World Cups, namely in 1999, 2011 and 2013. The team's greatest accomplishment is passing the group stage at the 1999 and 2013 tournaments.

The U20 team is the de facto U19 of the previous year, and it acts mainly as a feeder team for the U21s and provides further international development for youth players. The team qualifies for the FIFA U-20 World Cup based on the success of the U19 at the UEFA European Under-19 Championship.

== History ==
The U20 national team was formed in 1994. The first match was played against the team of Austrian region Styria, and the first match against FIFA member was against Italy on 8 February 1995.

Croatia managed to qualify for 1999 FIFA U-20 World Cup. That was the second appearance from the Croatian football team in the FIFA competition, after A team appeared on FIFA World Cup in France in 1998. They passed the group, then lost to Brazil by 4–0 in Round of 16.

On 24 July 2010, after trashing Portugal 5–0 in 2010 UEFA European Under-19 Championship group game, Croatia qualified for the semi-final. Also, it secured a spot in 2011 FIFA U-20 World Cup in Colombia.

Another good performance by the U19 team at 2012 championship saw Croatia qualifying for the World Cup, this time held in Turkey in 2013.

== Recent results ==
The following is a list of match results from the last 12 months, as well as any future matches scheduled.

Win Draw Loss Fixture

== Coaching staff ==
Position	Name
Head coach	(Croatia) Ognjen Vukojević
Assistant coaches	(Croatia) Mato Neretljak (Croatia) Mario Carević
Goalkeeping coach	(Croatia) Marjan Mrmić
Fitness coach	(Croatia) Ivan Krakan
Physiotherapists	(Croatia) Ivan Halambek
Doctors	(Croatia) Goran Madžarac
Chief instructor	(Croatia) Petar Krpan
Team manager	(Croatia) Denis Lukša

== Current squad ==
The following is the squad named for friendly matches against China played on 1 and 3 June 2023.

No.	Pos.	Player	Date of birth (age)	Caps	Goals	Club
	GK	Franko Kolić	7 February 2003 (age 23)	4	0	(Football Association of Bosnia and Herzegovina) Posušje
	GK	Mislav Zadro	22 April 2003 (age 23)	2	0	(Cyprus Football Association) Aris Limassol
	GK	Filip Kovačević	22 March 2002 (age 24)	1	0	(Croatian Football Federation) Cibalia
	DF	Mateo Lisica	9 July 2003 (age 23)	2	0	(Croatian Football Federation) Istra 1961
	DF	Moris Valinčić	17 November 2002 (age 23)	2	0	(Croatian Football Federation) Istra 1961
	DF	Vicko Ševelj	19 September 2000 (age 26)	5	1	(Football Association of Slovenia) Radomlje
	DF	Roko Jureškin	29 September 2000 (age 26)	5	0	(Italian Football Federation) Pisa
	DF	Krešimir Krizmanić	3 July 2000 (age 26)	2	0	(Croatian Football Federation) Gorica
	DF	Maro Katinić	13 April 2004 (age 22)	1	0	(Football Association of Slovenia) Bravo
	DF	Ivan Smolčić	17 August 2000 (age 26)	2	0	(Croatian Football Federation) Rijeka
	DF	Niko Galešić	26 March 2001 (age 25)	6	0	(Croatian Football Federation) Rijeka
	DF	Luka Jelenić	24 May 2000 (age 26)	1	0	(Croatian Football Federation) Varaždin
	DF	Nikola Soldo	25 January 2001 (age 25)	2	0	(German Football Association) 1. FC Kaiserslautern
	MF	Ante Palaversa	6 April 2000 (age 26)	4	0	(French Football Federation) Troyes
	MF	Ivan Ćubelić	2 June 2003 (age 23)	1	0	(Croatian Football Federation) Hajduk Split
	MF	Luka Stojković	28 October 2003 (age 23)	4	1	(Croatian Football Federation) Dinamo Zagreb
	MF	Adrian Liber	9 January 2001 (age 25)	4	0	(Croatian Football Federation) Rijeka
	MF	Leon Belcar	4 January 2002 (age 24)	6	0	(Croatian Football Federation) Varaždin
	MF	Niko Janković	25 August 2001 (age 25)	1	0	(Croatian Football Federation) Rijeka
	FW	Silvio Goričan	27 February 2000 (age 26)	3	0	(Croatian Football Federation) Lokomotiva Zagreb
	FW	Ante Crnac	17 December 2003 (age 22)	3	0	(Polish Football Association) Raków Częstochowa
	FW	Karlo Špeljak	14 March 2003 (age 23)	5	0	(Football Association of Slovenia) Celje
	FW	Bartol Barišić	1 January 2003 (age 23)	5	0	(Slovak Football Association) DAC Dunajská Streda
	FW	Michele Šego	5 August 2000 (age 26)	8	1	(Croatian Football Federation) Varaždin
	FW	Denis Bušnja	14 April 2000 (age 26)	4	2	(Croatian Football Federation) Rijeka

== Competitive record ==
Champions
Runners-up
Third place
Fourth place
Tournament played fully or partially on home soil

Croatian under-20 team played most of its matches competing in a regional cup called Mirop Cup, also known as Cup Alpe-Adria, with groups of Slovenia, Hungary, Italy, Slovakia and teams of some Austrian and Hungarian regions. Croatia won that cup three times in a row, in 1994, 1995 and 1996, and ever after.

=== FIFA U-20 World Cup record ===
FIFA U-20 World Cup record										Qualifications record	
Year	Round	Position	Pld	W	D	L	GF	GA	Squad	Qualifications record	
(Tunisia) 1977	Part of Yugoslavia										
(Japan) 1979	Part of Yugoslavia										
(Australia) 1981	Part of Yugoslavia										
(Mexico) 1983	Part of Yugoslavia										
(Soviet Union) 1985	Part of Yugoslavia										
(Chile) 1987	Part of Yugoslavia										
(Saudi Arabia) 1989	Part of Yugoslavia										
(Portugal) 1991	Part of Yugoslavia										
(Australia) 1993	Not a FIFA member										
(Qatar) 1995	Did not qualify									UEFA European Under-19 Championship	1994
(Malaysia) 1997	Did not qualify									UEFA European Under-19 Championship	1996
(Nigeria) 1999	Round of 16	14/24	4	1	2	1	6	6	1999	UEFA European Under-19 Championship	1998
(Argentina) 2001	Did not qualify									UEFA European Under-19 Championship	2000
(United Arab Emirates) 2003	Did not qualify									UEFA European Under-19 Championship	2002
(Netherlands) 2005	Did not qualify									UEFA European Under-19 Championship	2004
(Canada) 2007	Did not qualify									UEFA European Under-19 Championship	2006
(Egypt) 2009	Did not qualify									UEFA European Under-19 Championship	2008
(Colombia) 2011	Group stage	23/24	3	0	0	3	2	8	2011	UEFA European Under-19 Championship	2010
(Turkey) 2013	Round of 16	11/24	4	2	1	1	4	4	2013	UEFA European Under-19 Championship	2012
(New Zealand) 2015	Did not qualify									UEFA European Under-19 Championship	2014
(South Korea) 2017	Did not qualify									UEFA European Under-19 Championship	2016
(Poland) 2019	Did not qualify									UEFA European Under-19 Championship	2018
(Argentina) 2023	Did not qualify									UEFA European Under-19 Championship	2022
(Chile) 2025	Did not qualify									UEFA European Under-19 Championship	2024
(Uzbekistan) 2027	Qualified									UEFA European Under-19 Championship	2026
(Armenia) (Georgia (country)) 2029	TBD										
Total	Round of 16	3/26	11	3	3	5	12	18			

Draws include knockout matches decided via penalty shoot-out; correct as of 3 July 2013 after the match against Chile.

Matches
First match	Ghana 1–1 Croatia (Kaduna, Nigeria; 4 April 1999)
Biggest win	Croatia 5–1 Kazakhstan (Kaduna, Nigeria; 7 April 1999)
Biggest defeat	Brazil 4–0 Croatia (Calabar, Nigeria; 14 April 1999)

== Head-to-head record ==
Key

More wins than losses
As many wins as losses
Fewer wins than losses

Correct as of 30 May 2025, after the match against Qatar.

Opponent	Pld	W	D	L	GF	GA	GD	Win %
Albania	2	2	0	0	4	1	+3	100.00
Argentina	1	0	1	0	0	0	+0	0.00
Austria	1	1	0	0	5	2	+3	100.00
Belarus	3	3	0	0	6	1	+5	100.00
Brazil	1	0	0	1	0	4	−4	0.00
Chile	1	0	0	1	0	2	−2	0.00
Czech Republic	1	0	0	1	0	3	−3	0.00
France	1	0	1	0	1	1	+0	0.00
Ghana	1	0	1	0	1	1	+0	0.00
Hungary	12	8	2	2	32	16	+16	66.67
Italy	17	5	3	9	25	28	−3	29.41
Japan	1	0	0	1	0	1	−1	0.00
Kazakhstan	1	1	0	0	5	1	+4	100.00
Montenegro	1	0	1	0	0	0	+0	0.00
New Zealand	1	1	0	0	2	1	+1	100.00
Paraguay	1	0	0	1	1	2	−1	0.00
Qatar	4	2	1	1	7	4	+3	50.00
Russia	2	2	0	0	2	0	+2	100.00
Saudi Arabia	1	0	1	0	1	1	+0	0.00
Slovakia	4	3	1	0	8	3	+5	75.00
Slovenia	19	11	5	3	43	22	+21	57.89
Switzerland	1	0	0	1	1	4	−3	0.00
Turkey	3	1	0	2	4	5	−1	33.33
United States	1	0	0	1	0	1	−1	0.00
Uruguay	1	1	0	0	1	0	+1	100.00
Uzbekistan	1	0	1	0	1	1	+0	0.00
Vietnam	1	1	0	0	1	0	+1	100.00
67 teams played	84	42	18	24	180	109	+71	50.00

== See also ==
- Croatia national football team
- Croatia national football B team
- Croatia national under-23 football team
- Croatia national under-21 football team
- Croatia national under-19 football team
- Croatia national under-18 football team
- Croatia national under-17 football team
- Croatia national under-16 football team
- Croatia national under-15 football team
- Croatia women's national football team
- Croatia women's national under-19 football team
- Croatia women's national under-17 football team
- Croatia women's national under-15 football team

== Head-to-head record ==
The following table shows Croatia's head-to-head record in the FIFA U-20 World Cup.

Opponent	Pld	W	D	L	GF	GA	GD	Win %
Argentina	1	0	1	0	0	0	+0	0.00
Brazil	1	0	0	1	0	4	−4	0.00
Chile	1	0	0	1	0	2	−2	0.00
Ghana	1	0	1	0	1	1	+0	0.00
Guatemala	1	0	0	1	0	1	−1	0.00
Kazakhstan	1	1	0	0	5	1	+4	100.00
New Zealand	1	1	0	0	2	1	+1	100.00
Nigeria	1	0	0	1	2	5	−3	0.00
Saudi Arabia	1	0	0	1	0	2	−2	0.00
Uruguay	1	1	0	0	1	0	+1	100.00
Uzbekistan	1	0	1	0	1	1	+0	0.00
Total	11	3	3	5	12	18	−6	27.27
