= Francisco Wang =

Portuguese footballer (born 2010)

Personal information
- Date of birth: 14 February 2010 (age 16)
- Place of birth: Abrantes, Portugal
- Position: Winger

Team information
- Current team: Benfica

Youth career
- Benfica

International career^{‡}
Years	Team	Apps	(Gls)
2024	Portugal U15	3	(0)
- ‡ National team caps and goals as of 18 December 2024

Francisco Wang (Chinese: 弗朗西斯科-王: born 14 February 2010) is a Portuguese professional footballer who plays as a winger for Benfica.

== Early life ==
Wang was born on 14 February 2010. Born in Abrantes, Portugal, he is of Chinese descent through his parents.

== Club career ==
As a youth player, Wang joined the youth academy of Benfica. During the spring of 2026, he signed his first professional contract for the club.

== International career ==
Wang is a Portugal youth international. On 13 December 2024, he debuted for the Portugal national under-15 football team during a 3–0 home friendly win over the Ukraine national under-15 football team.

== Style of play ==
Wang plays as a winger. Chinese news website Hupu Sports wrote in that "his key attributes include high speed, explosive acceleration, and proficiency with both his left and right feet".
