= Vlatko Marković International Tournament =

International youth football tournament in Croatia

- Organiser(s): Croatian Football Association (HNS)
- Founded: 2019
- Teams: 8
- Current champions: Portugal (2nd title)
- Most championships: Croatia (4 titles)
- 2026

Vlatko Marković International Tournament is an association football tournament organised by the Croatian Football Association (HNS), contested by men's national under-15 teams. The tournament was established in 2019. The second tournament held in 2020 was contested by the under-16 teams. The tournament is held annually. The first winner of the tournament in 2019 was Argentina, the rest were won by Croatia, including the under-16 team in 2020.

The tournament is named after Vlatko Marković, a distinguished figure of Croatian football, former player, coach, manager and sports official who was president of the HNS from 1998 to 2012.

== Results ==
Year	Final			Third place playoff			Number of teams
Year	Winners	Score and venue	Runners-up	Third place	Score and venue	Fourth place	Number of teams
Under-15 teams
2019; Details	Argentina	1–1 (4–2 p) Stadion Mutila, Medulin	Mexico	Greece	1–0 Stadion Mutila, Medulin	Croatia	8
Under-16 teams
2020; Details	Croatia	4–0 Stadion Gradski vrt, Osijek	Poland	Qatar	Cancelled due to positive COVID-19 tests	Zambia	8
Under-15 teams
2021; Details	Croatia	1–1 (5–3 p) Stadion Branko Čavlović-Čavlek, Karlovac	Russia	Belarus	1–0 Sports Center Lucko, Lučko	Lithuania	8
2022; Details	Croatia	2–0 Stadion Varteks, Varaždin	Bosnia and Herzegovina	Republic of Ireland	3–3 (8–7 p) Stadion SRC Mladost, Čakovec	Wales	8
2023; Details	Croatia	1–1 (4–1 p) Stadion Kranjčevićeva, Zagreb	Belgium	Bosnia and Herzegovina	3–2 ŠRC Zaprešić, Zaprešić	Finland	8
2024; Details	United States	1–0 Stadion Varteks, Varaždin	Japan	France	2–0 Stadion Kranjčevičeva, Zagreb	England	8
2025; Details	Portugal	3–2 Stadion SRC Mladost, Čakovec	Croatia	France	2–2 Stadion Kranjčevičeva, Zagreb	England	8
2026; Details	Portugal	2–2 (4–1 p) Stadion Kranjčevićeva, Zagreb	Brazil	United States	2–2 (7–5 p) Stadion Kranjčevićeva, Zagreb	Japan	8

== See also ==
- Vlatko Marković International Tournament
