= Dany Freire =

Portuguese footballer (born 2010)

Personal information
- Full name: Daniel da Luz Lima Freire
- Date of birth: 19 September 2010 (age 16)
- Place of birth: Lisbon, Portugal
- Height: 1.82 m (6 ft 0 in)
- Positions: Midfielder; winger; forward

Team information
- Current team: Barcelona

Youth career
- –2023: Racing
- 2023–2026: Fola
- 2025–2026: → Racing (loan)
- 2026–: Barcelona

International career^{‡}
Years	Team	Apps	(Gls)
2024–2025	Luxembourg U15	3	(0)
2025	Portugal U15	4	(0)
- ‡ National team caps and goals as of 18 May 2025

Daniel da Luz Lima Freire (born 19 September 2010) is a professional footballer who plays as a midfielder, winger or forward Barcelona. Born in Luxembourg, he has represented Luxembourg and Portugal internationally at youth level.

== Early life ==
Freire was born on 19 September 2010 in Lisbon, Portugal. The son of Carlos and Ana, he moved with his family to Luxembourg at five months old and has obtained Luxembourgian citizenship and Portuguese citizenship.

== Club career ==
Freire joined the youth academy of Luxembourgian side Racing at the age of six. Following his stint there, he joined the youth academy of Fola in Luxembourg in 2023.

Two years later, he returned on loan to the youth academy of Racing, where he played in the UEFA Youth League and helped the club's under-17 team win the 2025–26 Coupe des Cadets. Subsequently, he joined the youth academy of Spanish La Liga outfit Barcelona in 2026 at age 16.

== International career ==
Freire has represented Luxembourg and Portugal internationally at youth level and has represented the former internationally at under-15 and has represented the latter internationally at under-15 level. Altogether, he made three appearances and scored zero goals while playing for the Luxembourg national under-15 football team and four appearances and scored zero goals while playing for the Portugal national under-15 football team.

On 20 October 2024, he debuted for the Luxembourg national under-15 football team during a 0–2 away friendly loss to the Poland national under-15 football team. On 13 May 2025, he debuted for the Portugal national under-15 football team during a 4–1 away friendly win over the Japan national under-15 football team.

== Style of play ==
Freire plays as a midfielder, winger or forward. Right-footed, he has received comparisons to Portugal international Rafael Leão and Brazil international Ronaldinho.
