= Sreten Ćuk =

Croatian football manager

Personal information
- Date of birth: 1 August 1963 (age 63)
- Place of birth: Zagreb, SFR Yugoslavia
- Position: Midfielder

Team information
- Current team: Croatia U15 (head coach)

Senior career*
Years	Team	Apps	(Gls)
1986-1987	Jugokeramika Zaprešić		
1988–1989	Dinamo Zagreb		

Managerial career
- 2010: Dinamo Zagreb
- 2011–2012: Gorica
- 2013–2014: Sesvete
- 2014–2015: Dinamo Zagreb B
- 2015–2016: Lokomotiva
- 2016–2018: Persepolis (assistant)
- 2020–2021: Karlovac
- 2022–: Croatia U15
- * Club domestic league appearances and goals

Sreten Ćuk (born 1 August 1963) is a Croatian football manager and former player.

== Managerial career ==
Ćuk was appointed manager of Lokomotiva in 2015, replacing Ante Čačić. He then took charge of Karlovac in September 2020 and in June 2022 he took charge of the Croatia national under-15 football team.
