= Portugal national under-15 football team =

National association football team

Portugal Under-15
- Nickname: Selecção das Quinas
- Association: Portuguese Football Federation
- Confederation: UEFA (Europe)
- Head coach: João Santos
- FIFA code: POR
First colours	Second colours
- Website: Portuguese Football Federation

The Portugal national under-15 football team represents Portugal in international Association football at this age level and is controlled by Federação Portuguesa de Futebol, the governing body for football in Portugal. They are also known as the Portugal Youth Team.

== History ==
The Portugal National Under-15 Football Team serves as a developmental squad, identifying and nurturing young talent for the future of Portuguese football. While detailed historical records of their early matches are not as extensively documented as senior national teams, their participation in international youth tournaments has become increasingly prominent. The team regularly competes in friendly tournaments and development cups, providing crucial international experience for its players. In recent years, the Portugal U-15 squad has achieved notable successes on the international stage. They were crowned champions of the CONCACAF Under-15 Championship in 2019, demonstrating their early potential. In the same year, they also secured victory in the Nations Cup (2019). A significant recent achievement for the team came in May 2025, when they won the Vlatko Marković International Tournament in Croatia. This marked their first title in this particular competition, triumphing with a 3–2 victory over Croatia in the final. This tournament also saw the notable international debut of promising young players, including Cristiano Ronaldo Júnior, who scored two crucial goals in the final match. Under the guidance of coaches like João Santos, appointed on August 1, 2024, the Portugal U-15 team continues to be a vital stepping stone for the country's aspiring footballers, contributing to the strong legacy of youth development in Portuguese football.

== Players ==
=== Current squad ===
The following players were named in the squad for the Vlatko Marković International Tournament in Croatia, held from 13 to 18 May 2025. Caps and goals are correct as of 18 May 2025, after the match against Croatia.

No.	Pos.	Player	Date of birth (age)	Caps	Goals	Club
	GK	André Marques	3 October 2010 (age 16)	5	0	(Portuguese Football Federation) Youth academy
	GK	Tiago Xavier	7 July 2010 (age 16)	6	0	(Portuguese Football Federation) Youth academy
	DF	Afonso Pereira	8 April 2010 (age 16)	3	0	(Portuguese Football Federation) Youth academy
	DF	Guilherme Lima	18 February 2010 (age 16)	3	0	(Portuguese Football Federation) Youth academy
	DF	Tiago Caires	20 March 2010 (age 16)	7	1	(Portuguese Football Federation) Youth academy
	DF	Valdir Fernandes	14 February 2010 (age 16)	8	0	(Portuguese Football Federation) Youth academy
	DF	Eduardo Alves	4 January 2010 (age 16)	4	0	(Portuguese Football Federation) Youth academy
	DF	Lourenço Fernandes	3 April 2010 (age 16)	9	0	(Portuguese Football Federation) Youth academy
	DF	Donte Lawrence	4 December 2010 (age 15)	4	0	(The Football Association) Tottenham Hotspur Youth
	DF	Salvador Ribeiro	12 March 2010 (age 16)	9	0	(Portuguese Football Federation) Youth academy
	MF	Henrique Maduro	22 January 2010 (age 16)	4	0	(Portuguese Football Federation) Youth academy
	MF	João Lopes	10 July 2010 (age 16)	6	0	(Portuguese Football Federation) Youth academy
	MF	Vicente Santos	22 June 2010 (age 16)	4	0	(Portuguese Football Federation) Youth academy
	MF	Guilherme Maia	27 December 2010 (age 15)	4	0	(Portuguese Football Federation) Youth academy
	MF	Goncalo Fontes	31 March 2010 (age 16)	9	0	(Portuguese Football Federation) Youth academy
	MF	Gonçalo Santos	15 May 2010 (age 16)	4	2	(Portuguese Football Federation) Youth academy
	FW	Cristiano Ronaldo Jr.	17 June 2010 (age 16)	4	2	(Saudi Arabian Football Federation) Al Nassr Youth
	FW	Carlos Moita	30 November 2010 (age 15)	4	1	(Portuguese Football Federation) SC Braga Youth
	FW	Henrique Amen	2 February 2010 (age 16)	4	1	(Portuguese Football Federation) Vitória SC Youth
	FW	Abdu Cassamá	15 August 2010 (age 16)	9	2	(Portuguese Football Federation) Youth academy
	FW	Dany Freire	19 September 2010 (age 16)	4	0	(Portuguese Football Federation) Youth academy
	FW	Rafael Cabral	23 September 2010 (age 16)	4	4	(Portuguese Football Federation) SC Braga Youth

== Results and fixtures ==
The following is a list of match results in the last 12 months, as well as any future matches that have been scheduled. Win Draw Loss Fixture

== Honours ==
- CONCACAF Under-15 Championship: 2019
- Nations Cup: 2019
- Vlatko Marković International Tournament: 2025

== See also ==
- Portugal national football team
