= Kotoriba =

- Municipality
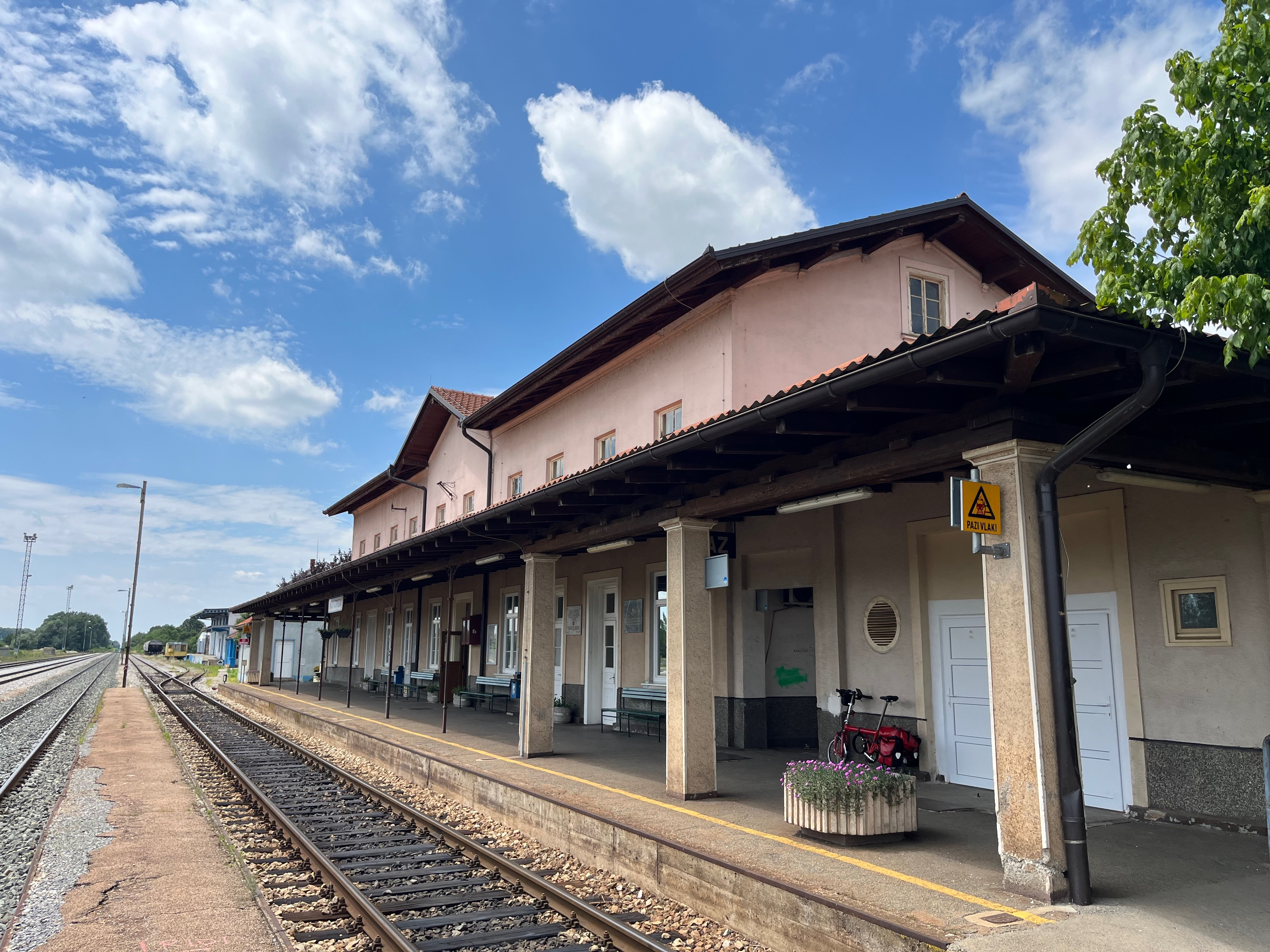
- Kotoriba railway station

- Location within Croatia
- Coordinates: 46°22′N 16°49′E
- Country: Croatia
- Region: Northern Croatia (Međimurje)
- County: Međimurje County

Government
  - Municipal mayor: Dario Friščić (HSLS)

Area
  - Municipality: 26.6 km^{2} (10.3 sq mi)
  - Urban: 26.6 km^{2} (10.3 sq mi)

Population (2021)
  - Municipality: 2,938
  - Density: 110/km^{2} (286/sq mi)
  - Urban: 2,938
  - Urban density: 110/km^{2} (286/sq mi)
- Time zone: UTC+1 (CET)
  - Summer (DST): UTC+2 (CEST)
- Postal code: 40329 Kotoriba
- Website: kotoriba.hr

Kotoriba (Hungarian: Kotor, earlier Kottori) is a village and municipality in Međimurje County, in northern Croatia.

Kotoriba is known for being the site of the oldest railway station in present-day Croatia. The opening ceremony was held on 24 April 1860.

== Geography ==
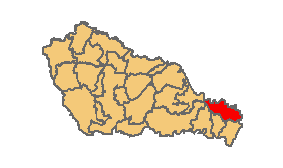
Location of Kotoriba within Međimurje County

It is located in the southeastern part of the county, near the Mura River and border with Hungary, approximately 36 kilometres southeast of Čakovec and 20 kilometres east of Prelog, the largest and second-largest cities of Međimurje County, respectively. It is connected with Čakovec by both road and railroad.

== Demographics ==
According to the 2021 census, the Kotoriba municipality had a total population of 2,938. Kotoriba is the only village in the municipality.

Kotoriba: Population trends 1857–2021
v

population	2633	2831	2994	3611	3779	4095	4129	3895	3895	3742	3847	3653	3360	3579	3333	3224	2938
	1857	1869	1880	1890	1900	1910	1921	1931	1948	1953	1961	1971	1981	1991	2001	2011	2021

Sources: Croatian Bureau of Statistics publications

== Administration ==
The current mayor of Kotoriba is Dario Friščić (HSLS) and the Kotoriba Municipal Council consists of 13 seats.

Groups	Councilors per group
HSLS	7 / 13
SDP-HSS-NPS	4 / 13
HDZ	2 / 13
