= NK Lokomotiva Zagreb =

Association football club in Croatia

Lokomotiva Zagreb
- Full name: Nogometni klub Lokomotiva Zagreb
- Nickname: Lokosi
- Short name: LOK
- Founded: 1 May 1914; 112 years ago as ŽŠK Victoria
- Ground: Stadion Maksimir
- Capacity: 24,851
- President: Miroslav Gluhinić
- Head coach: Nikica Jelavić
- League: Croatian Football League
- 2025–26: Croatian Football League, 5th of 10
- Website: nklokomotiva.hr
Home colours	Away colours	Third colours

Nogometni klub Lokomotiva Zagreb (lit. 'Football Club Lokomotiva Zagreb'), commonly known as Lokomotiva Zagreb or simply Lokomotiva, is a Croatian professional football club based in Zagreb. They compete in the Croatian Football League (HNL), the top tier of Croatian football. Founded in 1914, the club's first period of success came in the late 1940s and early 1950s, before spending most of the following five decades in lower-level leagues.

Between 2007 and 2009 they won three consecutive promotions to rise from the fourth level to the first in the Croatian football league system. They hosted their home matches at Stadion Maksimir for a couple of years before moving to Stadion Kranjčevićeva, as their own ground Igralište na Kajzerici in the Novi Zagreb's Kajzerica neighbourhood is unsuitable for the top-level football.

== History ==
NK Lokomotiva was founded as ŽŠK Victoria (Željezničarski športski klub "Victoria") in 1914.

After World War I, the name of the club was changed to Željezničar, under which they competed between the two wars. At that time, they were mostly in the shadow of the city's bigger clubs Građanski, Concordia and HAŠK. They played in the first level only in the 1940–41 season.

In 1945, the club was renamed Lokomotiva and soon their most productive years followed. They continuously played for 8 seasons (1947–1955) in the Yugoslav First League with the best league result in 1952, when they finished third, behind Hajduk Split and Red Star Belgrade. Some of the players at that time were Vladimir Čonč, Vladimir Firm, Drago Hmelina, Franjo Beserdi and Oto Bobek, younger brother of legendary Stjepan Bobek. They won Yugoslav Second League in 1956, but were relegated again from the First League in the summer of 1957 and never returned to the Yugoslav top flight again. They played in the Yugoslav Second League until 1970 and then also in the Yugoslav Inter-Republic League in the last years before the dissolution of Yugoslavia.

After Croatian independence and the formation of the Prva HNL in 1991, Lokomotiva played in the lower leagues of Croatian football, mostly spending their time in the Treća HNL. In 2006, before relegation to the fourth division, Lokomotiva became the feeder team for Dinamo Zagreb. This sparked a story of one of the most incredible rises through the leagues in Croatian football. Lokomotiva gained promotion in each of the next three season, finishing first in the Četvrta HNL in the 2006–07 season, second in the Treća HNL in the 2007–08 season, and third in the Druga HNL in the 2008–09 season.

The promotion from the second to the first division of Croatian football in 2009 meant that in the 2009–10 season, Lokomotiva would be back in the top flight for the first time after 52 years. The side recovered from a poor start in the league and finished in a respectable 8th position out of 16 teams, with notable victories 4–2 away against NK Zagreb, home 3–0 over Rijeka, and 2–1 over Hajduk Split. Their top scorer, Nino Bule, finished with 14 goals.

Due to rules against second sides being in the same division, they legally split their connection to Dinamo Zagreb. To meet the criteria for the Prva HNL, they played their games at Stadion Maksimir before moving on to Stadion Kranjčevićeva which is now the club's home. The club's base and youth teams area are located in Kajzerica neighborhood, at a ground known as Igralište na Kajzerici, which itself was a prominent motorcycle speedway stadium in the 1960s.

The 2012–13 season was one of the best in recent history for Lokomotiva. They finished in second place ahead of clubs such as Rijeka, Hajduk Split and RNK Split. Young star Andrej Kramarić, on loan from Dinamo Zagreb, finished second in the scoring charts with 15 goals. With the second-place finish, Lokomotiva qualified for the 2013–14 UEFA Europa League second qualifying round. In their first European encounter, the side faced FC Dinamo Minsk, losing on the away goals rule after winning 2–1 away from home, but losing 3–2 at home.

Lokomotiva established itself as a 1. HNL side, finishing between 4th and 6th place for the next six seasons. The club managed its first European aggregate victory over Airbus UK Broughton F.C. in the 2015–16 UEFA Europa League and navigating three stages of qualifying rounds in the 2016–17 UEFA Europa League, before losing 4–2 to Belgian Pro League side K.R.C. Genk in the playoff round.

In the 2019–20 season, which was interrupted by the COVID-19 pandemic, Lokomotiva had the best season in its history, finishing in second place in the league and finishing as runners-up in the Croatian Football Cup, losing 1–0 to Rijeka in the final. With Croatia's improved UEFA Ranking, this meant that Lokomotiva went into the 2020–21 UEFA Champions League qualifying rounds for the first time in its history, where it drew SK Rapid Wien in the second qualifying round.

=== Name changes ===
- ŽŠK Victoria (1914–1919)
- ŠK Željezničar (1919–1941)
- HŽŠK (1941–1945)
- FD Lokomotiva (1945–1946)
- FD Crvena Lokomotiva (1946–1947)
- NK Lokomotiva (1947–present)

== Honours ==
Croatian football league system

- Croatian First League
  - Runners-up (2): 2012–13, 2019–20
- Croatian Second League
  - Third place (1): 2008–09
- Croatian Cup
  - Runners-up (2): 2012–13, 2019–20

Yugoslav football league system

- Yugoslav First League
  - Third place (1): 1952
- Yugoslav Second League
  - Champions (1): 1955–56
  - Runners-up (2): 1957–58, 1958–59

== Crest and colours ==
=== Kit manufacturers and shirt sponsors ===
Period	Kit manufacturer	Shirt sponsor	Ref
2014–15	Nike	-	
2015–17	Nike	Crodux	
2017–19	Nike	-	
2019–22	Adidas	-	
2022–23	Macron	-	
2023–26	Macron	Favbet	

== Players ==
=== Current squad ===
As of 21 November 2026

Note: Flags indicate national team as defined under FIFA eligibility rules; some limited exceptions apply. Players may hold more than one non-FIFA nationality.

No.	Pos.	Nation	Player
1	GK	CRO	Krunoslav Hendija
2	DF	CRO	Jakov Gurlica
3	DF	CRO	Matej Mitrović
4	DF	GRE	Athanasios Triantafyllou
5	DF	CRO	Marijan Čabraja
6	MF	ALB	Feta Fetai
7	FW	MNE	Dušan Vuković
8	MF	CRO	Ivan Katić
9	MF	CRO	Leon Belcar
10	MF	CRO	Matija Subotić (captain)
11	FW	CRO	Lovre Kulušić (on loan from Dinamo Zagreb)
12	GK	CRO	Josip Posavec (vice-captain)
13	DF	AUS	Fran Karačić (on loan from Hajduk Split)
14	MF	SLO	Marcel Lorber
15	FW	CRO	Dominik Thaqi (on loan from Rijeka)
16	MF	BRA	Kayke

No.	Pos.	Nation	Player
17	DF	CRO	Marko Pajač
18	MF	KGZ	Erbol Atabayev
19	MF	TUN	Wajdi Sahli
20	DF	CRO	Kristijan Čabrajić
21	DF	CRO	Teodor Kralevski
22	FW	CRO	Mate Antunović
23	DF	MNE	Marko Vešović
24	FW	CRO	Mirko Marić
25	MF	CRO	Pavle Smiljanić
26	MF	KOS	Dardan Morina
27	DF	CRO	Luka Ćurković
28	FW	CRO	Noel Đurković
29	MF	CRO	Jakov-Anton Vasilj
30	MF	CRO	Duje Reić
32	GK	CRO	Luka Savatović
—	MF	USA	Lawson Sunderland

=== Dual registration ===
Note: Flags indicate national team as defined under FIFA eligibility rules; some limited exceptions apply. Players may hold more than one non-FIFA nationality.

No. / Pos. / Nation / Player; 27 / DF / CRO / Noa Godec (at Segesta)	No. / Pos. / Nation / Player; — / MF / CRO / Anes Huskić (at Sesvete)

=== Other players under contract ===
Note: Flags indicate national team as defined under FIFA eligibility rules; some limited exceptions apply. Players may hold more than one non-FIFA nationality.

No. / Pos. / Nation / Player; — / DF / CRO / Franjo Posavac	No. / Pos. / Nation / Player; — / MF / CRO / Mario Šitum

=== Out on loan ===
Note: Flags indicate national team as defined under FIFA eligibility rules; some limited exceptions apply. Players may hold more than one non-FIFA nationality.

No.	Pos.	Nation	Player
—	DF	CRO	Fran Žilinski (at Karlovac 1919 until 14 July 2027)
—	MF	CRO	Juraj Ljubić (at BSK Banja Luka until 29 June 2027)
—	MF	CRO	Festim Shatri (at Dugopolje until 26 June 2027)

No.	Pos.	Nation	Player
—	FW	CRO	Luka Bartolović (at Cibalia until 30 June 2027)
—	FW	BIH	Gojko Jelić (at Posušje until 29 June 2027)

== Recent seasons ==
Season	League									Cup	European competitions		Top league scorer	
Season	Division	P	W	D	L	F	A	Pts	Pos	Cup	European competitions		Player	Goals
2006–07	4. HNL	30	25	2	3	94	31	77	1st ↑				Jurica Jeleč	16
2007–08	3. HNL	34	28	2	4	105	32	86	2nd ↑				Robert Mesić	34
2008–09	2. HNL	30	18	5	7	50	30	59	3rd ↑				Mateo Poljak	8
2009–10	1. HNL	30	12	6	12	35	38	42	8th				Nino Bule	14
2010–11	1. HNL	30	8	9	13	24	37	33	14th	R1			Nino Bule	11
2011–12	1. HNL	30	12	8	10	33	33	44	7th				Andrej Kramarić	5
2012–13	1. HNL	33	16	9	8	54	38	57	2nd	RU			Andrej Kramarić	15
2013–14	1. HNL	36	15	7	14	57	59	52	5th		Europa League	QR2	Ante Budimir	14
2014–15	1. HNL	36	13	7	16	59	68	46	4th	QF			Domagoj Pavičić	8
2015–16	1. HNL	36	16	4	16	56	53	52	4th	QF	Europa League	QR2	Franko Andrijašević	12
2016–17	1. HNL	36	12	8	16	41	38	44	5th	QF	Europa League	PO	Josip Ćorić	6
2017–18	1. HNL	36	14	9	13	47	48	51	5th	SF			Lovro Majer	11
2018–19	1. HNL	36	13	10	13	51	43	49	6th	QF			Dejan Radonjić	8
2019–20	1. HNL	36	19	8	9	57	38	65	2nd	RU			Lirim Kastrati; Marko Tolić	11
2020–21	1. HNL	36	7	9	20	29	60	30	8th	R2	Champions League	QR2	Josip Pivarić	6
2020–21	1. HNL	36	7	9	20	29	60	30	8th	R2	Europa League	QR3	Josip Pivarić	6
2021–22	1. HNL	36	12	13	11	55	50	49	5th	QF			Marko Dabro	13
2022–23	HNL	36	11	10	15	45	50	43	7th	QF			Sandro Kulenović	9
2023–24	HNL	36	12	15	9	52	45	51	5th	SF			Duje Čop	12
2024–25	HNL	36	10	9	7	45	54	39	8th	QF			Robert Mudražija	14
2025–26	HNL	36	10	14	12	40	52	44	5th	QF			Aleks Stojaković	8

== European record ==
=== Summary ===
Competition	Pld	W	D	L	GF	GA	Last season played
UEFA Champions League	1	0	0	1	0	1	
UEFA Cup; UEFA Europa League	15	7	4	4	27	28	
Total	16	7	4	5	27	29	

Source: uefa.com, Last updated on 7 September 2022
Pld = Matches played; W = Matches won; D = Matches drawn; L = Matches lost; GF = Goals for; GA = Goals against. Defunct competitions indicated in italics.

=== Record by season ===
Season	Competition	Round	Opponent	Home	Away	Agg
2013–14	UEFA Europa League	QR2	(Belarus) Dinamo Minsk	2–3	2–1	4–4 (a)
2015–16	UEFA Europa League	QR1	(Wales) Airbus UK Broughton	2–2	3–1	5–3
2015–16	UEFA Europa League	QR2	(Greece) PAOK	2–1	0–6	2–7
2016–17	UEFA Europa League	QR1	(Andorra) UE Santa Coloma	4–1	3–1	7–2
2016–17	UEFA Europa League	QR2	(Finland) RoPS Rovaniemi	3–0	1–1	4–1
2016–17	UEFA Europa League	QR3	(Ukraine) FC Vorskla Poltava	0–0	3–2	3–2
2016–17	UEFA Europa League	PO	(Belgium) KRC Genk	2–2	0–2	2–4
2020–21	UEFA Champions League	QR2	(Austria) Rapid Wien	0–1		
2020–21	UEFA Europa League	QR3	(Sweden) Malmö FF		0–5	

== Personnel ==
=== Coaching staff ===
Position	Staff
Coach	(Croatia) Nikica Jelavić
Assistant coaches	(Croatia) Mate Maleš
Goalkeeping coach	(Croatia) Darko Horvat
Fitness Coach	(Croatia) Marko Sukreški
Doctors	(Croatia) Miroslav Gluhinić (Croatia) Frane Bukvić
Technical director	(Croatia) Igor Cvetković
Physiotherapists	(Croatia) Igor Bartolović (Croatia) Marko Grubić (Croatia) Ivan Rendulić

Last updated: 7 August 2025
Source: NK Lokomotiva official website

== Historical list of coaches ==
- (Socialist Federal Republic of Yugoslavia) Bogdan Cuvaj (1946–1952)
- (Socialist Federal Republic of Yugoslavia) August Bivec
- (Socialist Federal Republic of Yugoslavia) Slavko Kodrnja
- (Socialist Federal Republic of Yugoslavia) Mirko Kokotović
- (Socialist Federal Republic of Yugoslavia) Hermenegildo Kranjc
- (Socialist Federal Republic of Yugoslavia) Ivan Medarić
- (Croatia) Sreten Ćuk (2007 – Dec 30, 2008)
- (Croatia) Ilija Lončarević (Jan 1, 2009 – Mar 6, 2009)
- (Croatia) Željko Pakasin (C) (Mar 7, 2009 – Apr 29, 2009)
- (Croatia) Roy Ferenčina (Apr 29, 2009 – Oct 3, 2010)
- (Serbia) Ljupko Petrović (Oct 3, 2010 – Mar 14, 2011)
- (Croatia) Krunoslav Jurčić (Mar 14, 2011 – May 26, 2011)
- (Croatia) Marijo Tot (Jun 1, 2011 – Oct 29, 2011)
- (Croatia) Ante Čačić (Oct 31, 2011 – Dec 23, 2011)
- (Croatia) Tomislav Ivković (Dec 23, 2011 – May 11, 2015)
- (Croatia) Marko Pinčić (C) (May 11, 2015 – Jun 3, 2015)
- (Croatia) Ante Čačić (Jun 3, 2015 – Sep 21, 2015)
- (Croatia) Sreten Ćuk (Sep 21, 2015 – May 30, 2016)
- (Croatia) Valentin Barišić (May 30, 2016 – Jul 6, 2016)
- (Croatia) Mario Tokić (C) (Jul 6, 2016 – Jul 25, 2016)
- (Croatia) Tomislav Ivković (Jul 25, 2016 – Nov 14, 2016)
- (Croatia) Mario Tokić (Nov 14, 2016 – Dec 5, 2017)
- (Croatia) Draženko Prskalo (C) (Dec 5, 2017 – Dec 27, 2017)
- (Croatia) Goran Tomić (Dec 27, 2017 – Jan 9, 2021)
- (Croatia) Jerko Leko (Jan 9, 2021 – Mar 13, 2021)
- (Croatia) Samir Toplak (Mar 14, 2021 – May 28, 2021)
- (Croatia) Silvijo Čabraja (Jun 8, 2021 –Mar 19, 2025)
- (Croatia) Damir Ferenčina (C) (Mar 19, 2025 – Apr 24, 2025)
- (Croatia) Mario Cvitanović (Apr 24, 2025 – Jun 17, 2025)
- (Croatia) Nikica Jelavić (Jun 17, 2025 –)
