= Croatian checkerboard =

National symbol of Croatia and Croats

Escutcheon in the Seal of the Kingdom of Croatia

The Croatian checkerboard or checky (Croatian: šahovnica, pronounced [ʃaxǒːʋnit͡sa]) is the national symbol of Croatia and Croats. It covers the main shield of the Croatian coat of arms, above which there is a crown with five smaller shields. The squares are red and white, although the order has historically varied.

== History ==
=== Background ===
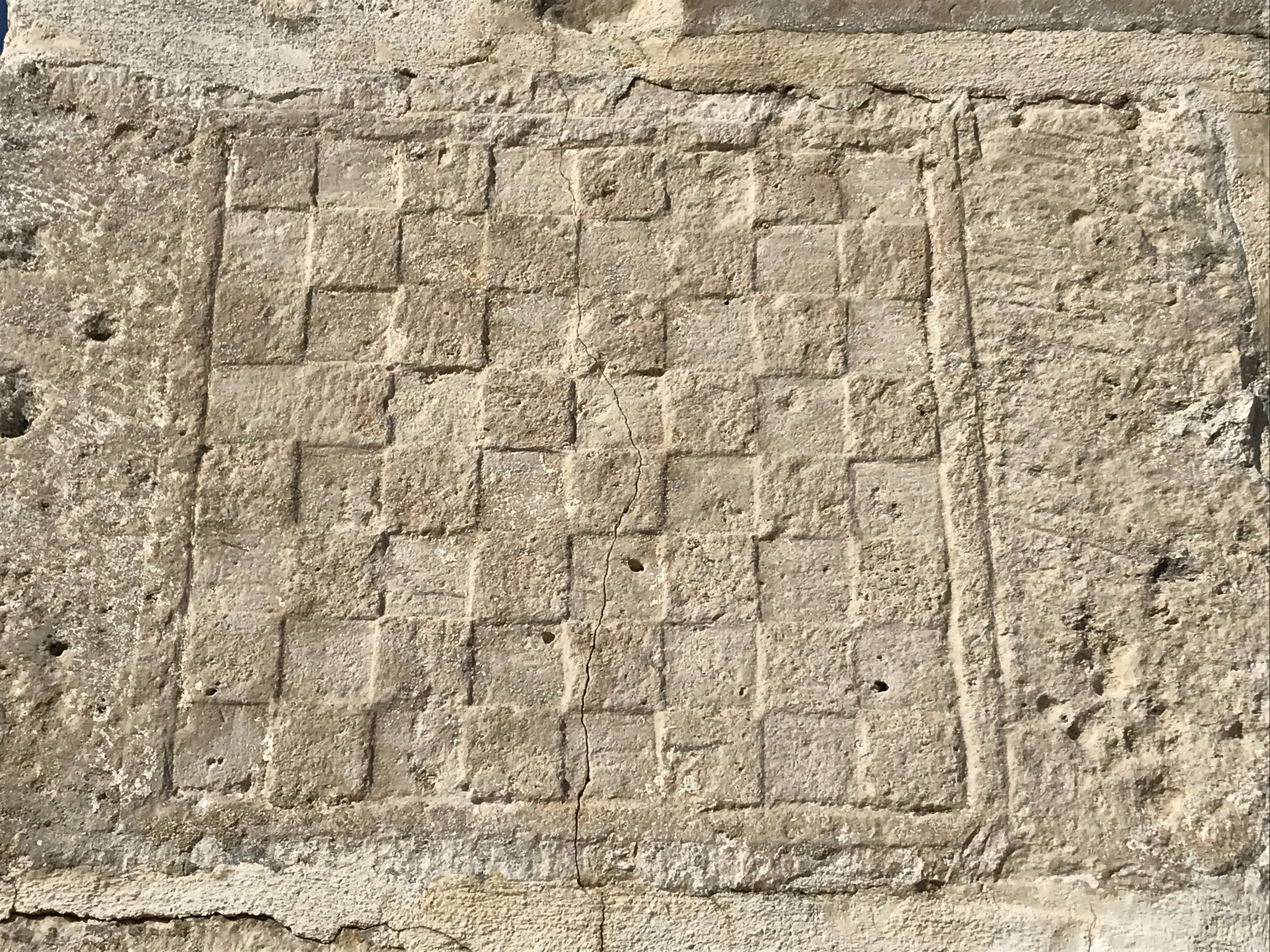
Croatian checkerboard from the Church of St. Lucy, Jurandvor

According to one legend, the Croatian king Stjepan Držislav was captured by the Venetians, only to challenge Doge Pietro II Orseolo to a chess match for his freedom. He went on to win all three games of said match, and in some versions even won control over the cities of Dalmatia as well. He then incorporated the chessboard pattern into his coat of arms to commemorate this triumph. However, the earliest known records of this story come much later than the events described, written in a greater literary context of romantic nation-building, and thus cannot be taken as historical.

An escutcheon of the Eucharistic star from an 11th-century baptistry in Split and a checkerboard-pattern carving on the bell tower of the Church of St. Lucy, Jurandvor are typically identified as the earliest examples of the checkerboard.

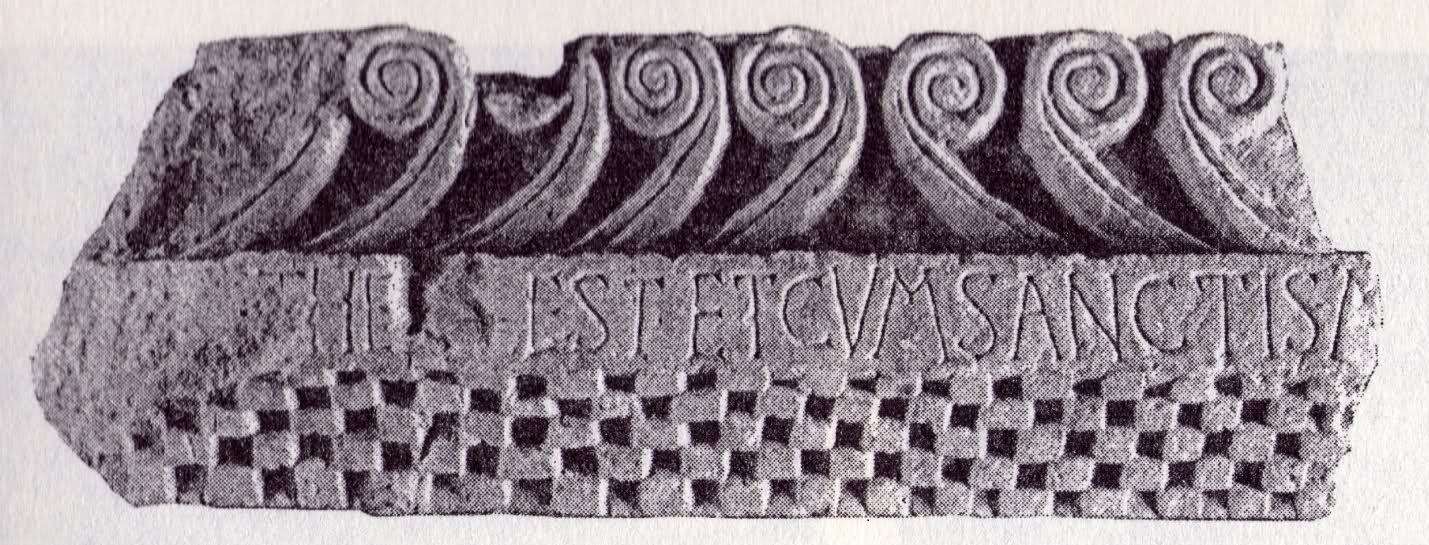
Fragment from the church of St. John of Nimfa

A chess pattern is observed in the architraves of a number of medieval churches in Croatia, including St. John of Nimfa in Pula, St. Vid at the Kaštel in Pula, and St. John in Biskupija at Pomer, where the motif can appear together with or instead of the Croatian interlace.

=== Use in coat of arms ===
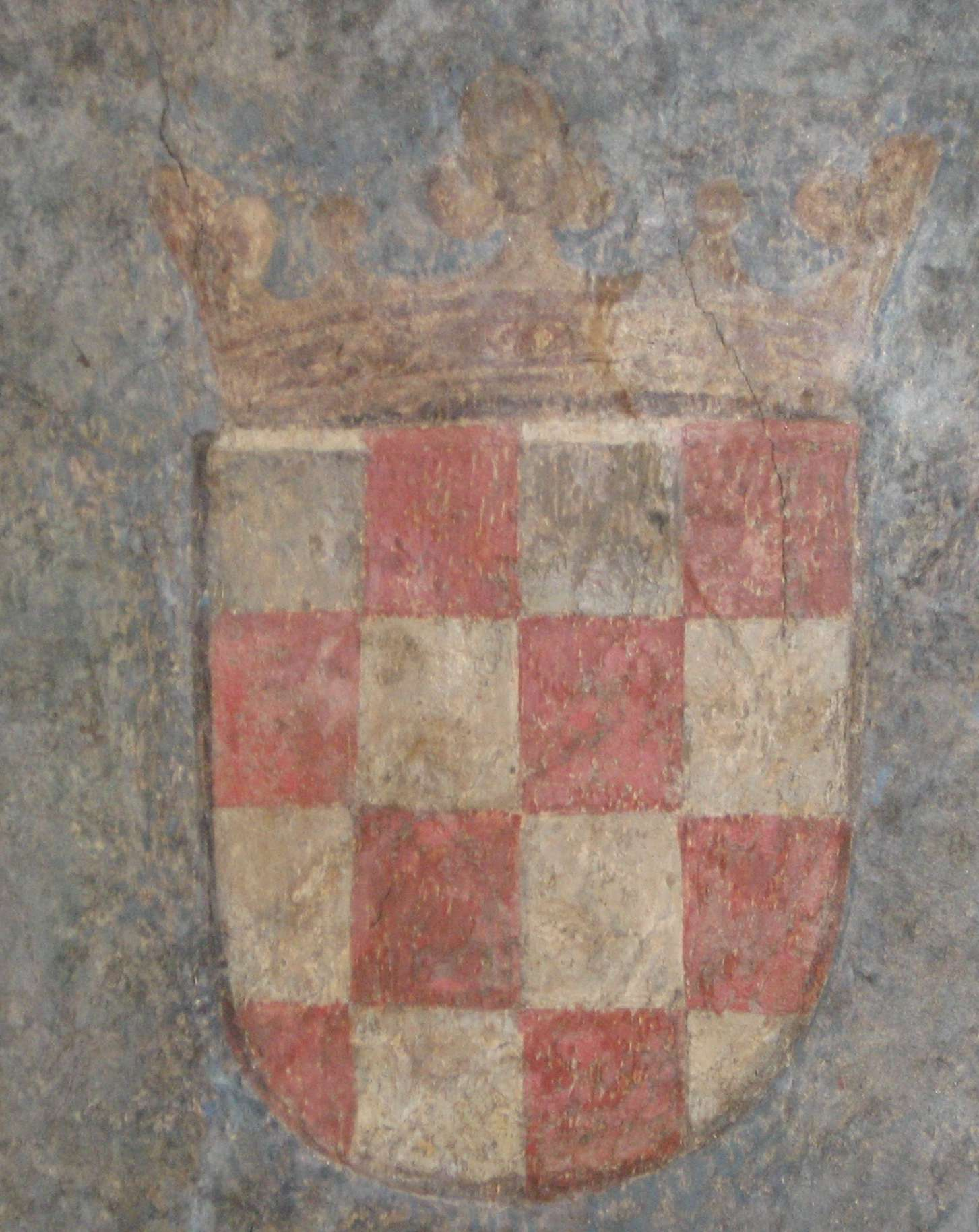
First known example as depicted in Innsbruck, Austria (1495).

One of the oldest coats of arms of the Croatian kingdom from 1495 is located in the Austrian town of Innsbruck and is located on the front of the temple hall of Herzog-Friedrichstrasse 35. It is assumed that the creation of the Croatian coat of arms was stimulated by the emperor Maximilian I from whose time it originated the coat of arms of Innsbruck, but also some other coats of arms, preserved in today's Germany and Austria.

It is also assumed that the number of preserved Croatian shielded coat of arms from the time of the Habsburg ruler should be thanked to the fact that the Peace of Pressburg from November 7, 1491, gave him and his house the inheritance of the Hungarian-Croatian throne in case Jagiellonian dynasty would not have legitimate male offspring, but also the stipulation that Maximilian I could keep the title of the Hungarian (and Croatian) king. For this reason, it would not be strange that he had just spurred the emergence of a Croatian chess coat, if it did not exist before. The Habsburgs, however, became Hungarian-Croatian kings only a few decades later, with the 1527 election in Cetin, so it is more likely that the then-ruling Jagiellonian dynasty were to commemorate the use of that coat-of-arms.

The Co-Cathedral of the Assumption of Mary, Senj contains a relief from 1491 that contains the coat of arms of the local nobleman Ludovik Perović which matches the 5x5 or 5x6 Croatian checkerboard pattern.

The money printed by Nicholas of Ilok between 1472 and 1475 contains a rhomboid checkered pattern on a coat of arms, but this shape is more commonly associated with the iconography of the Patriarch of Aquileia Louis of Teck.

In some interpretations it is mentioned that the white color indicates White Croatia and the red color Red Croatia. There is also a belief in the meaning of the color of the first field in the coat of arms, according to which the first white field is the independence of Croatia, and the first red field is its subordinate position, but this belief is of the newer date and does not have any confirmation in earlier lore and historical evidence.

== Other uses ==
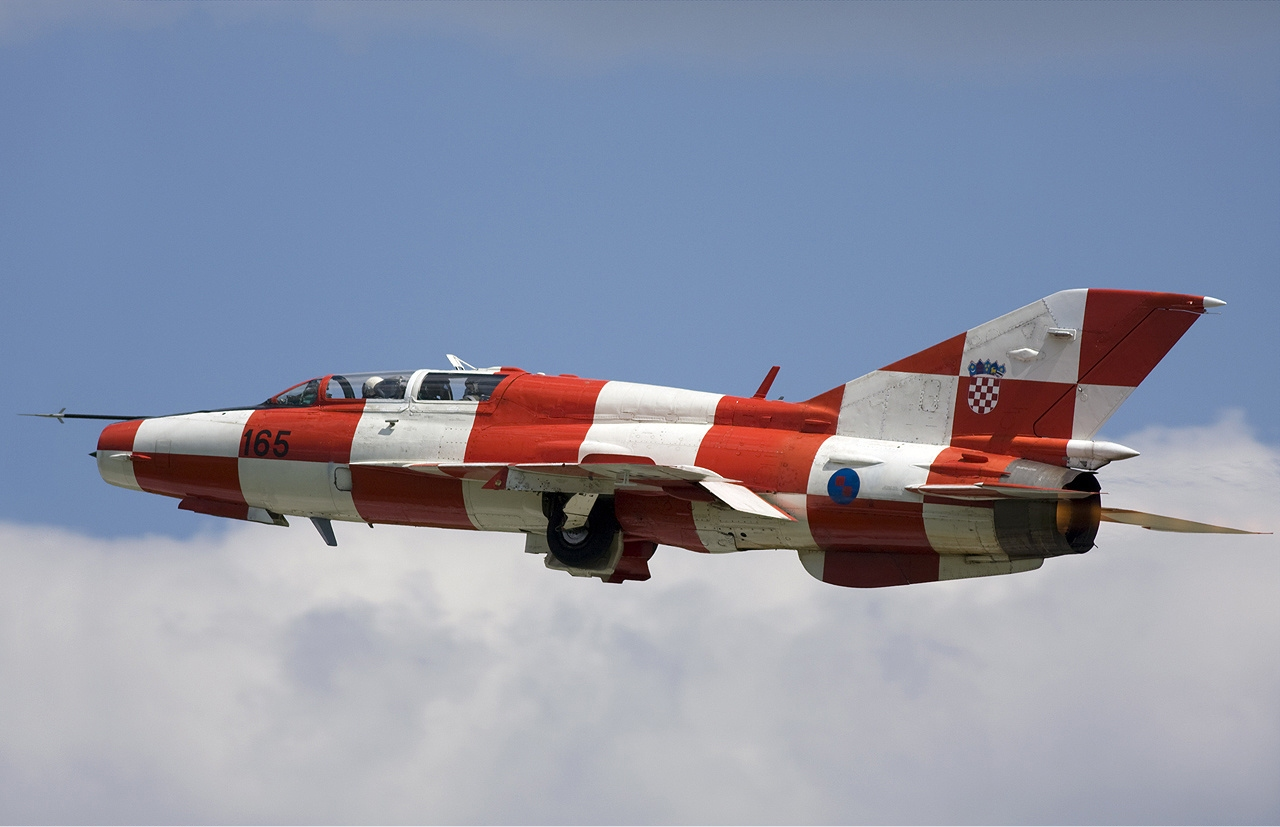
A Croatian Air Force MiG-21 UMD is painted in a red-white Croatian checkerboard.

Jerseys and hats using the checkerboard are widely used by Croatian sports fans. It can also be found as a decoration on various tourist souvenirs.

Croatian euro coins have also featured the checkerboard on the obverse side.

== Gallery ==
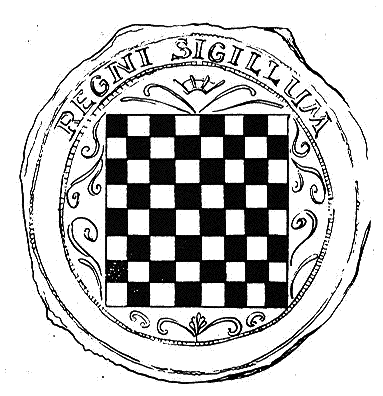
Coat of arms of Croatia used in 1527 as part of a seal on the Cetingrad Charter.

Kingdom of Croatia (1525–1868).

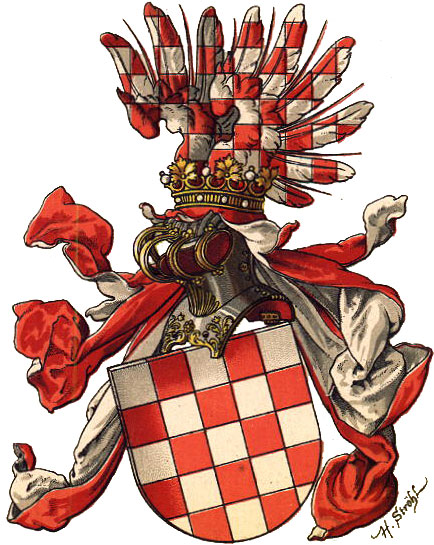
Coat of arms of Croatian crown land (until 1868).

Kingdom of Croatia-Slavonia (1868–1918).

Coat of arms of Transleithania (1868–1915).

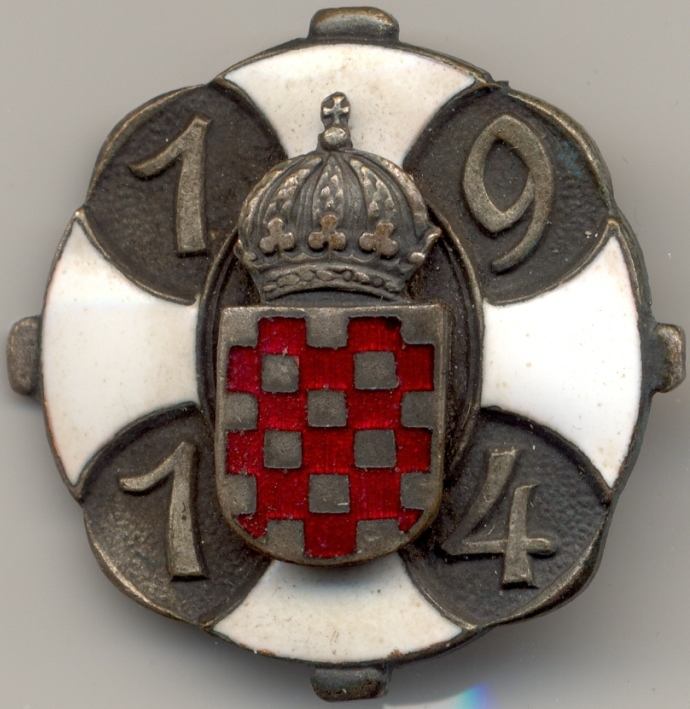
Patriotic badge from 1914.

Coat of Arms of The Kingdom of Yugoslavia.

Banovina of Croatia (1939–1943).

Banovina of Croatia greater version (1939–1943).

Independent State of Croatia (1941–1945).

Socialist Republic of Croatia (1947–1990).

Early coat of arms of the Republic of Croatia (1990).

Coat of arms of Croatia after 1990.

== See also ==
Coat of arms of the Duchy of Jawor, a Piast-ruled duchy of Silesian region, one of many containing the pattern in West Slavic heraldry.

- National symbols of Croatia
- Coat of arms of Croatia
- Check (pattern), esp. the matching pattern and color combination found on airports
