= 2023–24 NK Rudeš season =

NK Rudeš
2023–24 season
- Manager: Davor Mladina
- Stadium: Stadion Kranjčevićeva
- Croatian Football League: 10th (relegated)
- Croatian Football Cup: Quarter-finals

The 2023–24 NK Rudeš season is the club's 67th season in existence and its first season back in the top flight of Croatian football. In addition to the domestic league, NK Rudeš will participate in this season's edition of the Croatian Football Cup. The season covers the period from 1 July 2023 to 30 June 2024.

== Players ==
=== First-team squad ===
As of 1 October 2023

Note: Flags indicate national team as defined under FIFA eligibility rules; some limited exceptions apply. Players may hold more than one non-FIFA nationality.

| No. | Pos. | Nation | Player |
|---|---|---|---|
| 1 | GK | CRO | Karlo Kralj |
| 2 | DF | CRO | Dominik Mihaljević |
| 4 | DF | CRO | Luka Pavković |
| 5 | DF | CRO | Dominik Pavlek |
| 6 | MF | CRO | Tomislav Srbljinović |
| 7 | MF | CRO | Ivan Pešić |
| 8 | FW | CRO | Vinko Petković (on loan from Osijek) |
| 9 | FW | SWE | Robin Simović |
| 10 | FW | MNE | Aleksa Latković |
| 11 | DF | CRO | Ivan Tomečak |
| 12 | GK | CRO | Eugen Ciban |
| 13 | MF | CRO | Vanja Vukmanović |
| 14 | MF | MKD | Andrej Lazarov |
| 16 | DF | CRO | Mislav Matić |
| 18 | DF | FRA | Aboubacar Camara |

| No. | Pos. | Nation | Player |
|---|---|---|---|
| 19 | FW | CRO | Fran Topić (on loan from Dinamo Zagreb) |
| 21 | MF | CRO | Jakov Bašić |
| 22 | FW | CRO | Krešimir Kovačević |
| 23 | MF | BIH | Riad Mašala |
| 24 | FW | CRO | Dominik Rešetar |
| 26 | DF | POR | Miguel Campos |
| 27 | MF | CRO | Luka Pasariček |
| 29 | MF | BIH | Edin Šehić |
| 30 | FW | GHA | Brian Oddei |
| 33 | GK | CRO | Ivan Perić |
| 34 | MF | CRO | Karlo Špeljak (on loan from Celje) |
| 42 | MF | CRO | Ivica Vidović |
| 44 | GK | CRO | Matej Marković |
| 90 | DF | CRO | Mateo Pavlović (on loan from Rijeka) |
| 99 | GK | CRO | Mario Marić |

=== Out on loan ===
Note: Flags indicate national team as defined under FIFA eligibility rules; some limited exceptions apply. Players may hold more than one non-FIFA nationality.

| No. | Pos. | Nation | Player |
|---|---|---|---|
| 13 | MF | CRO | Vanja Šare (at Sesvete until 14 June 2024) |
| 20 | FW | CRO | Roko Brajković (at Šibenik until 15 June 2024) |
| 28 | MF | CRO | Mihael Stipić (at Jarun until 15 June 2024) |

== Transfers ==
=== In ===
| Pos. | Player | Transferred from | Fee | Date | Source |
|---|---|---|---|---|---|
| FW | (Croatia) Ivor Ljubanović | (Croatia) NK Dubrava | Undisclosed | 7 July 2023 | |
| MF | (Ghana) Brian Oddei | (Italy) Sassuolo | Undisclosed | 18 July 2023 | |
| DF | (Croatia) Mateo Pavlović | (Croatia) Rijeka | Loan | 8 September 2023 | |

=== Out ===
| Pos. | Player | Transferred to | Fee | Date | Source |
|---|---|---|---|---|---|
| MF | (Ghana) Brian Oddei | (Italy) Sassuolo | Loan return | 30 June 2023 | |
| FW | (Croatia) Ivor Ljubanović | (Croatia) NK Sesvete | Free | 14 September 2023 | |
| FW | (Croatia) Tomislav Gudelj | NK Croatia Zmijavci | Undisclosed | 15 September 2023 | |

== Pre-season and friendlies ==
Win Draw Loss Fixtures

| 28 June 2023 Friendly | Rudeš (Croatia) | 0–0 | (Croatia) Gorica | Zagreb |
| 18:00 CET (UTC+1) | | Report | | Stadium: Igralište NK Rudeš |

| 6 July 2023 Friendly | FK Napredak (Serbia) | 0–1 | (Croatia) Rudeš |
| 17:30 CET (UTC+1) |

| 12 July 2023 Friendly | Rudeš (Croatia) | 0–1 | (Croatia) Varaždin |
| 19:00 CET (UTC+1) |

| 17 November 2023 Friendly | Zalaegerszegi TE (Hungary) | 1–1 | (Croatia) Rudeš |
| 13:00 CET (UTC+1) |

| 6 January 2024 Friendly | Gorica (Croatia) | 3–0 | (Croatia) Rudeš |
| 12:00 CET (UTC+1) |

| 12 January 2024 Friendly | Rudeš (Croatia) | 1–3 | (Croatia) Rogaška |
| 12:00 CET (UTC+1) |

| 13 January 2024 Friendly | NK Sesvete (Croatia) | 1–2 | (Croatia) Rudeš |
| 12:00 CET (UTC+1) |

== Competitions ==
=== Overview ===
| Competition | First match | Last match | Starting round | Record | | | | | | | |
| Competition | First match | Last match | Starting round | Pld | W | D | L | GF | GA | GD | Win % |
|---|---|---|---|---|---|---|---|---|---|---|---|
| Croatian Football League | 22 July 2023 | | Matchday 1 | 23 | 0 | 4 | 19 | 7 | 49 | −42 | 0.00 |
| Croatian Football Cup | 27 September 2023 | | Round of 32 | 2 | 2 | 0 | 0 | 4 | 1 | +3 | 100.00 |
| Total | | | | 25 | 2 | 4 | 19 | 11 | 50 | −39 | 8.00 |

Last updated: 17 February 2024
Source: Soccerway

=== Croatian Football League ===
==== League table ====
| Pos | Team | Pld | W | D | L | GF | GA | GD | Pts | Qualification or relegation |
|---|---|---|---|---|---|---|---|---|---|---|
| 6 | Varaždin | 36 | 10 | 12 | 14 | 39 | 47 | −8 | 42 | |
| 7 | Gorica | 36 | 11 | 8 | 17 | 35 | 50 | −15 | 41 | |
| 8 | Istra 1961 | 36 | 10 | 11 | 15 | 36 | 54 | −18 | 41 | |
| 9 | Slaven Belupo | 36 | 9 | 6 | 21 | 43 | 69 | −26 | 33 | |
| 10 | Rudeš (R) | 36 | 1 | 6 | 29 | 22 | 85 | −63 | 9 | Relegation to First Football League |

Source: SuperSport HNL
Rules for classification: 1) Points; 2) Head-to-head points; 3) Head-to-head goal difference; 4) Head-to-head goals scored (at home if two teams tied); 5) Goal difference; 6) Goals scored; 7) Play-off
(Note: Criteria 2-4 and 7 is only used if deciding champion, teams to international competition or teams for relegation and in that case criteria 6 will not be used).
(R) Relegated

==== Results summary ====
| Overall | | | | | | | | Home | | | | | | Away | | | | | |
| Pld | W | D | L | GF | GA | GD | Pts | W | D | L | GF | GA | GD | W | D | L | GF | GA | GD |
|---|---|---|---|---|---|---|---|---|---|---|---|---|---|---|---|---|---|---|---|
| 0 | 0 | 0 | 0 | 0 | 0 | 0 | 0 | 0 | 0 | 0 | 0 | 0 | 0 | 0 | 0 | 0 | 0 | 0 | 0 |

Last updated: November 2023.

==== Results by round ====
| Round | 1 |
|---|---|
| Ground | |
| Result | |
| Position | |

Updated to match(es) played on November 2023. Source:
A = Away; H = Home; W = Win; D = Draw; L = Loss

==== Matches ====
The league fixtures were unveiled on 12 June 2023.

| 22 July 2023 1 | Rijeka | 4–0 | Rudeš | Rijeka |
| 18:45 | Janković 40' (pen.), 68'; Fruk 80'; Goda 89' | Report | | Stadium: Stadion Rujevica; Referee: Mateo Erceg |

| 30 July 2023 2 | Rudeš | 3–4 | Osijek | Zagreb |
| 18:45 | Lazarov 23'; Pasariček 34', 39' | Report | Mierez 43'; Caktaš 76', 83', 88' | Stadium: Stadion Kranjčevićeva; Referee: Mario Zebec |

| 5 August 2023 3 | Slaven Belupo | 3–2 | Rudeš | Koprivnica |
| 18:45 | Crnac 44'; Međimorec 56', 74' | Report | Latković 45'; Tomečak 78' | Stadium: Gradski stadion Referee: Igor Pajač |

| 12 August 2023 4 | Varaždin | 2–0 | Rudeš | Varaždin |
| 20:00 | Brodić 57'; Postonjski 77' | Report | | Stadium: Stadion Varteks; Referee: Ante Terzić |

| 20 August 2023 5 | Rudeš | 0–2 | Hajduk Split | Zagreb |
| 18:50 | | Report | Melnjak 4'; Livaja 15' | Stadium: Stadion Kranjčevićeva; Referee: Patrik Kolarić |

| 27 August 2023 6 | Istra 1961 | 0–0 | Rudeš | Pula |
| 18:30 | | Report | | Stadium: Stadion Aldo Drosina; Referee: Mario Zebec |

| 17 February 2024 23 | Rudeš | 0–2 | Hajduk Split | Zagreb |
| 17:10 | | | Livaja 48'; Dajaku 90+7' | Stadium: Stadion Kranjčevićeva; Referee: Dario Bel |

| 24 February 2024 24 | Istra 1961 | v | Rudeš | Pula |
| 17:10 | | | | Stadium: Stadion Aldo Drosina |

=== Croatian Football Cup ===
| 27 September 2023 Round of 32 | Croatia Zmijavci | 0–1 | Rudeš | Zmijavci |
| 15:30 | | | Srbljinović 78' | Stadium: Stadion ŠRC Marijan Šuto Mrma; Referee: Antonio Melnjak |

| 31 October 2023 Round of 16 | Rudeš | 3–1 | Slaven Belupo | Zagreb |
| 14:00 | | Report | | Stadium: Igralište NK Rudeš; Referee: Patrik Kolarić |

| 28 February 2024 Quarter-finals | Rudeš | v | Rijeka | Zagreb |
| 15:00 | | | | Stadium: Stadion Kranjčevićeva |
