= 2024–25 in Croatian football =

Football in Croatia
- Season: 2024–25

Men's football
- HNL: Rijeka
- 1. NL: Vukovar 1991
- 2. NL: Hrvace
- Croatian Cup: Rijeka

Women's football
- Prva HNLŽ: Agram
- Croatian Cup: Osijek

The following article presents a summary of the 2024–25 football season in Croatia, which is the 34th season of competitive football in the country.

== National teams ==
=== Croatia ===
Date	Venue	Opponents	Score	Croatia scorer(s)	Report
UEFA Euro 2024 – Group stage
15 June 2024	Olympiastadion, Berlin	Spain	0–3		UEFA.com
19 June 2024	Volksparkstadion, Hamburg	Albania	2–2	Kramarić, Gjasula (o.g.)	UEFA.com
24 June 2024	Red Bull Arena, Leipzig	Italy	1–1	Modrić	UEFA.com
2024–25 UEFA Nations League A – Group stage
5 September 2024	Estádio da Luz, Lisbon	Portugal	1–2	Dalot (o.g.)	UEFA.com
8 September 2024	Opus Arena, Osijek	Poland	1–0	Modrić	UEFA.com
12 October 2024	Stadion Maksimir, Zagreb	Scotland	2–1	Matanović, Kramarić	UEFA.com
15 October 2024	Śląski Stadium, Chorzów	Poland	3–3	Sosa, P. Sučić, Baturina	UEFA.com
15 November 2024	Hampden Park, Glasgow	Scotland	0–1		UEFA.com
18 November 2024	Stadion Poljud, Split	Portugal	1–1	Gvardiol	UEFA.com
2024–25 UEFA Nations League – Quarter-finals
20 March 2025	Stadion Poljud, Split	France			UEFA.com
23 March 2025	Stade de France, Saint-Denis	France			UEFA.com

=== Croatia U21 ===
Date	Venue	Opponents	Score	Croatia scorer(s)	Report
2025 UEFA European Under-21 Championship qualification – Group stage
5 September 2024	Sport Centre Rudes, Zagreb	Faroe Islands	2–1	Ljubičić, Ivanović	UEFA.com
10 September 2024	Stadion Branko Čavlović-Čavlek, Karlovac	Portugal	0–2		UEFA.com
11 October 2024	Ivan Kušek-Apaš City Stadium, Koprivnica	Andorra	2–0	Beljo, Hodža	UEFA.com
15 October 2024	Ivan Kušek-Apaš City Stadium, Koprivnica	Greece	3–2	Kačavenda, Beljo, Vušković	UEFA.com
2025 UEFA European Under-21 Championship qualification – Play-offs
15 November 2024	Mikheil Meskhi Stadium, Tbilisi	Georgia	0–1		UEFA.com
19 November 2024	Stadion Rujevica, Rijeka	Georgia	3–2 (a.e.t.); 6–7 (p)	Beljo (2), Šotiček	UEFA.com

=== Croatia U19 ===
Date	Venue	Opponents	Score	Croatia scorer(s)	Report
2025 UEFA European Under-19 Championship qualification - Qualifying round
13 November 2024	Ivan Laljak-Ivić Stadium, Zaprešić	Armenia	4–0	Durdov, Živković, Baždarić (2)	UEFA.com
16 November 2024	Ivan Laljak-Ivić Stadium, Zaprešić	Belarus	2–0	Baždarić, Lukić	UEFA.com
19 November 2024	Ivan Laljak-Ivić Stadium, Zaprešić	Serbia	0–3		UEFA.com
2025 UEFA European Under-19 Championship qualification - Elite round
19 March 2025		Netherlands			UEFA.com
22 March 2025		Czech Republic			UEFA.com
25 March 2025		Luxembourg			UEFA.com

=== Croatia U17 ===
Date	Venue	Opponents	Score	Croatia scorer(s)	Report
2025 UEFA European Under-17 Championship qualification - Round 1
9 October 2024	Arena Kombëtare, Tirana	Albania	1–1	Kurti (o.g.)	UEFA.com
12 October 2024	Arena Kombëtare, Tirana	Faroe Islands	7–0	Smiljanić, P. Horvat (2), N. Horvat, Mišura, Vojvodić, Kusanović	UEFA.com
15 October 2024	Arena Kombëtare, Tirana	Netherlands	3–1	P. Horvat, Kusanović (2)	UEFA.com
2025 UEFA European Under-17 Championship qualification - Round 2
19 March 2025		Ukraine			UEFA.com
22 March 2025		Slovakia			UEFA.com
25 March 2025		Italy			UEFA.com

=== Croatia Women's ===
Date	Venue	Opponents	Score	Croatia scorer(s)	Report
UEFA Women's Euro 2025 qualifying League B - Group stage
12 July 2024	Stadion Branko Čavlović-Čavlek, Karlovac	Wales	0–3		UEFA.com
16 July 2024	Petar Miloševski Training Centre, Skopje	Ukraine	0–2		UEFA.com
UEFA Women's Euro 2025 qualifying play-offs - First round
25 October 2024	Stadion Varteks, Varaždin	Northern Ireland	1–1	Lojna	UEFA.com
29 October 2024	Windsor Park, Belfast	Northern Ireland	0–1 (a.e.t.)		UEFA.com

=== Croatia Women's U19 ===
Date	Venue	Opponents	Score	Croatia scorer(s)	Report
2025 UEFA Women's Under-19 Championship qualification - Round 1
27 November 2024	Stadion Sv. Josip Radnik, Sesvete	Luxembourg	1–0	Vlajčević	UEFA.com
30 November 2024	Stadion Lučko, Lučko	Malta	3–0	Vlajčević (2), Grdiša	UEFA.com
3 December 2024	Ivan Laljak-Ivić Stadium, Zaprešić	Slovenia	0–1		UEFA.com
2025 UEFA Women's Under-19 Championship qualification - Round 2
March 2025		North Macedonia			
March 2025		Armenia			
March 2025		Lithuania			

=== Croatia Women's U17 ===
Date	Venue	Opponents	Score	Croatia scorer(s)	Report
2025 UEFA Women's Under-17 Championship qualification - Round 1
1 November 2024	Stadion Hrvatski vitezovi, Dugopolje	Italy	0–2		UEFA.com
4 November 2024	Gradski stadion Hrvace, Hrvace	France	1–1	Bandula	UEFA.com
7 November 2024	Stadion Hrvatski vitezovi, Dugopolje	Bulgaria	2–0	Grgić, Bandula	UEFA.com
2025 UEFA Women's Under-17 Championship qualification - Round 2
March 2025		Italy			
March 2025		Czech Republic			
March 2025		Georgia			

== League tables ==
=== Croatian Football League ===
Pos	Team	Pld	W	D	L	GF	GA	GD	Pts	Qualification or relegation (Note: The 2024–25 Croatian Football Cup winners qualify for the Europa League first qualifying round (or the second-placed team if the Croatian Cup winners finish first). If the Croatian Cup winners finish in the top three, the second Conference League second qualifying round spot will be passed to the fourth-placed team.)
1	Rijeka (C)	36	18	11	7	49	21	+28	65 (Note: Head to head points (GD) = Rijeka 5 (+3), Dinamo Zagreb 5 (-3).)	Qualification to Champions League second qualifying round
2	Dinamo Zagreb	36	19	8	9	69	41	+28	65	Qualification to Europa League league phase
3	Hajduk Split	36	17	12	7	49	34	+15	63	Qualification to Conference League second qualifying round
4	Varaždin	36	11	16	9	28	24	+4	49	Qualification to Conference League second qualifying round
5	Slaven Belupo	36	13	9	14	42	45	−3	48	
6	Istra 1961	36	11	15	10	39	42	−3	48	
7	Osijek	36	11	9	16	46	52	−6	42	
8	Lokomotiva	36	10	9	17	45	54	−9	39	
9	Gorica	36	9	10	17	29	51	−22	37	
10	Šibenik (R)	36	7	9	20	28	60	−32	30	Relegation to First Football League

Source: SuperSport HNL
Rules for classification: 1) Points; 2) Head-to-head points; 3) Head-to-head goal difference; 4) Head-to-head goals scored (at home if two teams tied); 5) Goal difference; 6) Goals scored; 7) Play-off
(Note: Criteria 2-4 and 7 is only used if deciding champion, teams to international competition or teams for relegation and in that case criteria 6 will not be used).
(C) Champions; (R) Relegated

==== Prva nogometna liga ====
Pos	Team	Pld	W	D	L	GF	GA	GD	Pts	Qualification or relegation
1	Vukovar 1991 (C, P)	33	21	9	3	55	14	+41	72	Promotion to the Croatian Football League
2	Opatija	33	19	11	3	48	20	+28	68	
3	Orijent	33	14	14	5	46	31	+15	56	
4	Sesvete	33	14	7	12	36	32	+4	49	
5	Cibalia	33	12	10	11	47	39	+8	46	
6	Dubrava	33	14	4	15	35	36	−1	46	
7	BSK Bijelo Brdo	33	13	7	13	40	42	−2	46	
8	Croatia Zmijavci	33	10	10	13	33	43	−10	40	
9	Rudeš	33	10	9	14	31	33	−2	39	
10	Jarun	33	9	10	14	33	39	−6	37	
11	Dugopolje	33	6	13	14	33	52	−19	31	Relegation play-off
12	Zrinski Osječko 1664 (R)	33	1	6	26	15	71	−56	9	Relegation to the Second Football League

Source: Prva NL
Rules for classification: 1) Points; 2) Head-to-head points; 3) Head-to-head goal difference; 4) Head-to-head goals scored (at home if two teams tied); 5) Goal difference; 6) Goals scored; 7) Play-off
(Note: Criteria 2-4 and 7 is only used if deciding champion, teams for promotion or relegation and in that case criteria 6 will not be used).
(C) Champions; (P) Promoted; (R) Relegated

==== Druga nogometna liga ====
Pos	Team	Pld	W	D	L	GF	GA	GD	Pts	Qualification or relegation
1	Hrvace (C, P)	30	20	4	6	71	41	+30	64	Promotion to the First Football League
2	Karlovac 1919 (P)	30	19	5	6	50	20	+30	62	Promotion to the First Football League
3	Jadran Luka Ploče	30	16	7	7	62	38	+24	55	
4	Mladost Ždralovi	30	16	7	7	55	32	+23	55	
5	Solin	30	17	3	10	54	33	+21	54	
6	Bjelovar	30	16	6	8	56	37	+19	54	
7	Radnik Križevci	30	14	6	10	49	37	+12	48	
8	Kustošija	30	13	9	8	51	40	+11	48	
9	Uljanik Pula	30	10	6	14	41	45	−4	36	
10	Trnje	30	9	8	13	40	53	−13	35	
11	Segesta	30	10	4	16	50	69	−19	34	
12	Dragovoljac	30	9	5	16	36	45	−9	32	
13	Marsonia 1909 (R)	30	10	1	19	40	75	−35	31	Relegation to the Third Football League
14	Dugo Selo	30	8	6	16	45	60	−15	30	
15	Grobničan	30	8	4	18	33	59	−26	28	
16	Jadran Poreč (R)	30	3	3	24	25	74	−49	12	Relegation to the Third Football League

Source: Druga-NL.com
Rules for classification: 1) Points; 2) Head-to-head points; 3) Head-to-head goal difference; 4) Head-to-head goals scored (at home if two teams tied); 5) Goal difference; 6) Goals scored; 7) Play-off
(Note: Criteria 2-4 and 7 is only used if deciding champion, teams for promotion or relegation and in that case criteria 6 will not be used).
(C) Champions; (P) Promoted; (R) Relegated

=== Sjever (North) ===
Pos	Team	Pld	W	D	L	GF	GA	GD	Pts	Qualification or relegation
1	Varteks	30	22	3	5	72	23	+49	69	Qualification to Promotion play-offs
2	NK Polet	30	19	4	7	80	33	+47	61	
3	Bilogora	30	19	4	7	61	42	+19	61	
4	Pitomača	30	17	5	8	68	34	+34	56	
5	Podravina	30	16	7	7	54	35	+19	55	
6	Rudar Mursko Središće	30	15	6	9	51	38	+13	51	
7	Graničar Đurđevac	30	13	6	11	49	43	+6	45	
8	Graničar Kotoriba	30	13	4	13	51	51	0	43	
9	Dinamo Domašinec	30	12	6	12	40	36	+4	42	
10	Garić	30	10	5	15	33	47	−14	35	
11	Nedelišće	30	9	6	15	39	55	−16	33 (Note: Head-to-head points: Koprivnica 4pts; Nedelišće 1pt.)	
12	Koprivnica	30	9	6	15	40	57	−17	33	
13	Dinamo Predavac	30	10	2	18	49	75	−26	32	
14	Međimurje	30	8	5	17	34	66	−32	29	
15	Slatina	30	5	6	19	30	72	−42	17 (Note: Slatina were deducted four points)	
16	Virovitica	30	4	3	23	33	77	−44	15	Relegation

Updated to match(es) played on 31 May 2025. Source: HNS
Rules for classification: 1) Points, 2) Head-to-head points, 3) Head-to-head goal difference, 4) Goal difference, 5) Matches won, 6) Goals scored

=== Zapad (West) ===
Pos	Team	Pld	W	D	L	GF	GA	GD	Pts	Qualification or relegation
1	Halubjan	20	12	5	3	42	24	+18	41	Qualification to Promotion play-offs
2	Kraljevica	20	11	4	5	41	28	+13	37	
3	Rudar Labin	20	11	3	6	34	27	+7	36 (Note: Head-to-head points: Rudar Labin 4pts; Buje 1pt.)	
4	Buje	20	10	6	4	30	19	+11	36	
5	Pomorac	20	10	4	6	39	28	+11	34	
6	Krk	20	9	5	6	30	20	+10	32	
7	Pazinka	20	9	3	8	29	24	+5	30 (Note: Head-to-head goal difference: Pazinka +1; Vinodol -1.)	
8	Vinodol	20	8	6	6	26	23	+3	30	
9	Nehaj	20	6	10	4	27	22	+5	28	
10	Novalja	20	7	4	9	33	32	+1	25	
11	Banjole	20	7	4	9	30	30	0	25	
12	Crikvenica	20	7	4	9	19	35	−16	25	
13	Naprijed Hreljin	20	5	5	10	15	23	−8	20	
14	Rovinj	20	5	4	11	25	43	−18	19	
15	Medulin 1921	20	4	5	11	19	31	−12	17	
16	Cres	20	2	2	16	17	47	−30	8	Relegation

Updated to match(es) played on 1 April 2025. Source: HNS
Rules for classification: 1) Points, 2) Head-to-head points, 3) Head-to-head goal difference, 4) Goal difference, 5) Matches won, 6) Goals scored

=== Centar (Centre) ===
Pos	Team	Pld	W	D	L	GF	GA	GD	Pts	Qualification or relegation
1	Lučko	21	13	2	6	39	24	+15	41	Qualification to Promotion play-offs
2	Kurilovec	20	12	3	5	24	13	+11	39	
3	Ravnice	20	11	5	4	39	21	+18	38	
4	Trešnjevka	21	11	4	6	29	19	+10	37	
5	Samobor	21	12	1	8	29	24	+5	37	
6	Gaj Mače	21	10	6	5	32	18	+14	36	
7	Zagorec Krapina	20	10	3	7	35	22	+13	33	
8	Tigar Sveta Nedelja	21	9	2	10	34	38	−4	29	
9	Ponikve	20	8	4	8	31	29	+2	28	
10	Dinamo Odranski Obrež	20	7	6	7	22	32	−10	27	
11	Bistra	21	7	3	11	20	27	−7	24	
12	Maksimir	20	7	1	12	26	34	−8	22	
13	Mladost Petrinja	20	5	6	9	22	35	−13	21	
14	Sava Strmec	21	5	4	12	27	39	−12	19	
15	HAŠK 1903	21	5	3	13	15	37	−22	18	
16	Vrapče	20	5	1	14	15	27	−12	16	Relegation

Updated to match(es) played on 9 April 2025. Source: HNS
Rules for classification: 1) Points, 2) Head-to-head points, 3) Head-to-head goal difference, 4) Goal difference, 5) Matches won, 6) Goals scored

=== Istok (East) ===
Pos	Team	Pld	W	D	L	GF	GA	GD	Pts	Qualification or relegation
1	Borac Kneževi Vinogradi	18	9	6	3	28	16	+12	33	Qualification to Promotion play-offs
2	Đakovo Croatia	18	9	5	4	34	21	+13	32	
3	Vinogorac	18	8	7	3	30	21	+9	31	
4	Radnički Dalj	18	7	7	4	23	15	+8	28	
5	Slavonija Požega	18	7	5	6	27	18	+9	26	
6	Tomislav Donji Andrijevci	18	7	5	6	32	25	+7	26	
7	Svačić	18	8	2	8	21	27	−6	26	
8	Belišće	18	7	4	7	31	24	+7	25	
9	Valpovka	18	7	4	7	23	22	+1	25	
10	Čepin	18	7	3	8	19	20	−1	24	
11	Vuteks Sloga	18	6	5	7	22	30	−8	23	
12	Graničar Županja	18	6	4	8	20	30	−10	22	
13	Tomislav Cerna	18	6	2	10	24	33	−9	20	
14	Slavija Pleternica	18	4	7	7	26	35	−9	19	
15	Bedem Ivankovo	18	4	6	8	20	30	−10	18	
16	NAŠK	18	5	2	11	17	30	−13	17	Relegation

Updated to match(es) played on 21 March 2025. Source: HNS
Rules for classification: 1) Points, 2) Head-to-head points, 3) Head-to-head goal difference, 4) Goal difference, 5) Matches won, 6) Goals scored

=== Jug (South) ===
Pos	Team	Pld	W	D	L	GF	GA	GD	Pts	Qualification or relegation
1	Uskok (C)	30	20	4	6	55	22	+33	64	Promotion to the 2.NL
2	Zadar	30	18	7	5	63	30	+33	61	
3	Neretva	30	17	7	6	68	38	+30	58	
4	Zagora	30	17	4	9	73	35	+38	55	
5	Sloga Mravince	30	16	5	9	64	42	+22	53	
6	Vodice	30	14	6	10	49	51	−2	48	
7	Junak Sinj	30	13	6	11	45	43	+2	45	
8	GOŠK Kaštela	30	12	7	11	51	40	+11	43	
9	Neretvanac	30	8	11	11	31	49	−18	35	
10	Hrvatski Vitez	30	9	8	13	35	50	−15	35	
11	Val	30	9	6	15	47	60	−13	33	
12	Omiš	30	8	7	15	33	52	−19	31	
13	GOŠK Dubrovnik	30	6	11	13	22	39	−17	29	
14	Kamen Podbablje	30	8	5	17	41	61	−20	29	
15	Primorac Biograd	30	6	10	14	28	52	−24	28	
16	Zmaj Makarska (R)	30	3	8	19	18	59	−41	17	Relegation

Updated to match(es) played on 31 May 2025. Source: HNS
Rules for classification: 1) Points, 2) Head-to-head points, 3) Head-to-head goal difference, 4) Goal difference, 5) Matches won, 6) Goals scored
(C) Champions; (R) Relegated

== Cup results ==
14 May 2025
18:00

Slaven Belupo	1–1	Rijeka
Bosec 69'	Report	Fruk 26'

Gradski stadion Ivan Kušek-Apaš, Koprivnica
Attendance: 4,448
Referee: Patrik Kolarić (Čakovec)

29 May 2025
18:00

Rijeka	1–0	Slaven Belupo
Djouahra 60'	Report

Stadion Rujevica, Rijeka
Attendance: 8,181
Referee: Dario Bel (Osijek)

== Croatian clubs in Europe ==
=== Summary ===
Club	Competition	Starting round	Final round	Matches played
Dinamo Zagreb	Champions League	Play-off round	TBD	8
Rijeka	Europa League	2nd qualifying round	3rd qualifying round	4
Rijeka	Conference League	Play-off round		2
Hajduk Split	Conference League	2nd qualifying round	3rd qualifying round	4
Osijek	Conference League	2nd qualifying round	3rd qualifying round	4
ŽNK Osijek	Women's Champions League	1st qualifying round	2nd qualifying round	4
Dinamo Zagreb U19	Youth League	League phase	TBD	6
Lokomotiva Zagreb U19	Youth League	Second round	TBD	4

=== Dinamo Zagreb ===
Date	Venue	Opponents	Score	Dinamo Zagreb scorer(s)	Report
2024–25 Champions League - Play-off round
20 August 2024	Stadion Maksimir, Zagreb	(Azerbaijan) Qarabağ	3–0	Pjaca, Kulenović (2)	UEFA.com
28 August 2024	Tofiq Bahramov Republican Stadium, Baku	(Azerbaijan) Qarabağ	2–0	Pjaca, Silva (o.g.)	UEFA.com
2024–25 UEFA Champions League - League phase
17 September 2024	Allianz Arena, Munich	(Germany) Bayern Munich	2–9	Petković, Ogiwara	UEFA.com
2 October 2024	Stadion Maksimir, Zagreb	(France) Monaco	2–2	Sučić, Baturina	UEFA.com
23 October 2024	Red Bull Arena, Wals-Siezenheim	(Austria) Red Bull Salzburg	2–0	Kulenović, Petković	UEFA.com
5 November 2024	Národný futbalový štadión, Bratislava	(Slovakia) Slovan Bratislava	4–1	Špikić, Sučić, Kulenović (2)	UEFA.com
27 November 2024	Stadion Maksimir, Zagreb	(Germany) Borussia Dortmund	0–3		UEFA.com
10 December 2024	Stadion Maksimir, Zagreb	(Scotland) Celtic	0–0		UEFA.com
22 January 2025	Emirates Stadium, London	(England) Arsenal			UEFA.com
29 January 2025	Stadion Maksimir, Zagreb	(Italy) Milan			UEFA.com

=== Rijeka ===
Date	Venue	Opponents	Score	Rijeka scorer(s)	Report
2024–25 Europa League - Second qualifying round
25 July 2024	Sibiu Municipal Stadium, Sibiu	(Romania) Corvinul Hunedoara	0–0		UEFA.com
1 August 2024	Stadion Rujevica, Rijeka	(Romania) Corvinul Hunedoara	1–0	Petrovič	UEFA.com
2024–25 Europa League - Third qualifying round
8 August 2024	Stadion Rujevica, Rijeka	(Sweden) Elfsborg	1–1	Galešić	UEFA.com
15 August 2024	Borås Arena, Borås	(Sweden) Elfsborg	0–2		UEFA.com
2024–25 Conference League - Play-off round
22 August 2024	Stadion Rujevica, Rijeka	(Slovenia) Olimpija Ljubljana	1–1	Ivanović	UEFA.com
29 August 2024	Stožice Stadium, Ljubljana	(Slovenia) Olimpija Ljubljana	0–5		UEFA.com

=== Hajduk Split ===
Date	Venue	Opponents	Score	Hajduk Split scorer(s)	Report
2024–25 Conference League - Second qualifying round
25 July 2024	Stadion Poljud, Split	(Faroe Islands) HB Tórshavn	2–0	Uremović, Livaja	UEFA.com
1 August 2024	Tórsvøllur, Tórshavn	(Faroe Islands) HB Tórshavn	0–0		UEFA.com
2024–25 Conference League - Third qualifying round
8 August 2024	Štadión pod Čebraťom, Ružomberok	(Slovakia) Ružomberok	0–0		UEFA.com
15 August 2024	Stadion Poljud, Split	(Slovakia) Ružomberok	0–1		UEFA.com

=== Osijek ===
Date	Venue	Opponents	Score	Osijek scorer(s)	Report
2024–25 Conference League - Second qualifying round
25 July 2024	Opus Arena, Osijek	(Estonia) FCI Levadia	5–1	Miérez (3), Guedes, Bukvić	UEFA.com
1 August 2024	Lilleküla Stadium, Tallinn	(Estonia) FCI Levadia	1–0	Pušić	UEFA.com
2024–25 Conference League - Third qualifying round
8 August 2024	Opus Arena, Osijek	(Azerbaijan) Zira	1–1	Matković	UEFA.com
15 August 2024	Dalga Arena, Baku	(Azerbaijan) Zira	2–2 (a.e.t.); 1–2 (p)	Jugović, Matković	UEFA.com

=== ŽNK Osijek ===
Date	Venue	Opponents	Score	ŽNK Osijek scorer(s)	Report
2024–25 UEFA Women's Champions League - First qualifying round
4 September 2024	Stadion Gradski vrt, Osijek	(Slovakia) Spartak Myjava	2–0	Lojna (2)	UEFA.com
7 September 2024	Stadion Gradski vrt, Osijek	(Republic of Ireland) Peamount	2–1	Lojna, Petković	UEFA.com
2024–25 UEFA Women's Champions League - Second qualifying round
18 September 2024	Stadion Gradski vrt, Osijek	(Netherlands) Twente	1–4	Balić	UEFA.com
26 September 2024	De Grolsch Veste, Enschede	(Netherlands) Twente	0–4		UEFA.com

=== Dinamo Zagreb U19 ===
Date	Venue	Opponents	Score	Dinamo Zagreb U19 scorer(s)	Report
2024–25 UEFA Youth League - League phase
17 September 2024	FC Bayern Campus, Munich	(Germany) Bayern Munich	1–2	Rimac	UEFA.com
2 October 2024	Ivan Laljak-Ivić Stadium, Zaprešić	(France) Monaco	1–0	Horvat	UEFA.com
23 October 2024	Akademie Salzburg, Liefering	(Austria) Red Bull Salzburg	2–3	Šunta, Šepić	UEFA.com
5 November 2024	National Training Centre, Senec	(Slovakia) Slovan Bratislava	2–2	Šunta, Horvat	UEFA.com
27 November 2024	Ivan Laljak-Ivić Stadium, Zaprešić	(Germany) Borussia Dortmund	0–0		UEFA.com
10 December 2024	Ivan Laljak-Ivić Stadium, Zaprešić	(Scotland) Celtic	2–1	Šutalo, Rimac	UEFA.com
2024–25 UEFA Youth League - Round of 32
11–12 February 2025		(Spain) Barcelona			

=== Lokomotiva Zagreb U19 ===
Date	Venue	Opponents	Score	Lokomotiva Zagreb U19 scorer(s)	Report
2024–25 UEFA Youth League Domestic Champions Path - Second round
23 October 2024	Branko Čavlović-Čavlek, Karlovac	(Belarus) Dinamo Minsk	2–1	Utrobičić, Đurković	UEFA.com
27 October 2024	Sv. Josip Radnik, Sesvete	(Belarus) Dinamo Minsk	0–0		UEFA.com
2024–25 UEFA Youth League Domestic Champions Path - Third round
27 November 2024	Central Stadium Hagi Academy, Ovidiu	(Romania) Farul Constanța	2–0	Perković, Baždarić	UEFA.com
12 December 2024	Sv. Josip Radnik, Sesvete	(Romania) Farul Constanța	4–1	Đurković, Canjuga (2), Perković	UEFA.com
2024–25 UEFA Youth League - Round of 32
11–12 February 2025		(Austria) Sturm Graz			
