= 2026–27 First Football League (Croatia) =

Prva nogometna liga
- Season: 2026-27
- Dates: 22 August 2026 – May 2027
- All statistics correct as of 29 July 2026.

The 2026–27 First Football League (also known as Prva nogometna liga and 1. NL) is the 36th season of the second-level football competition for men's association football teams in Croatia, since its establishment in 1992. The league is contested by 16 teams and played in a double round robin format. This is the fifth season that the second level of men's football in Croatia is named First football league (Prva nogometna liga).

== Teams ==
=== Changes ===
NK Rudeš was promoted to the 2026–27 HNL, while NK Jarun Zagreb was relegated to 2026–27 Druga NL.

Newcomers are HNK Vukovar 1991, Dinamo Zagreb II, HNK Segesta, NK Kustošija , NK Jadran Luka Ploče and NK Mladost Ždralovi.

=== Stadia and locations ===
Locations of teams in 2026–27 Prva NL

Team	City	Stadium	Capacity
BSK Bijelo Brdo	Bijelo Brdo	Stadion BSK	1,200
Cibalia	Vinkovci	Stadion Cibalia	9,958
Croatia Zmijavci	Zmijavci	Stadion Marijan Šuto Mrma	2,000
Dubrava	Zagreb	Stadion NŠC Stjepan Spajić	5,000
Dugopolje	Dugopolje	Stadion Hrvatski vitezovi	5,200
Hrvace	Hrvace	Gradski stadion	3,075
Dinamo II	Zagreb	Ivan Laljak-Ivić Stadium	5,228
Karlovac 1919	Karlovac	Stadion Branko Čavlović-Čavlek	12,000
Opatija	Opatija	Stadion Kantrida	10,600
Orijent	Rijeka	Stadion Krimeja	3,500
Kustošija	Zagreb	Stadion Kustošija	2,550
Sesvete	Sesvete	Stadion Sveti Josip radnik	2,000
Vukovar	Vukovar	Stadion Borovo naselje	6,000
Segesta	Sisak	Gradski stadion (Sisak)	8,000
Jadran LP	Ploče	Jadranovo	1,000
Mladost	Ždralovi	Stadion Brdo	1,000

== League table ==
Pos	Team	Pld	W	D	L	GF	GA	GD	Pts	Qualification or relegation
1	Mladost Ždralovi	13	8	2	3	15	10	+5	26	Promotion to the Croatian Football League
2	Croatia Zmijavci	12	7	1	4	18	12	+6	22	
3	Jadran Luka Ploče	12	5	5	2	19	14	+5	20	
4	Kustošija	12	5	4	3	13	10	+3	19	
5	Cibalia	12	5	4	3	12	11	+1	19	
6	Sesvete	13	5	3	5	18	13	+5	18	
7	Segesta	13	5	3	5	17	15	+2	18	
8	Dinamo II	13	6	0	7	19	18	+1	18	
9	BSK Bijelo Brdo	13	5	3	5	17	18	−1	18	
10	Orijent	13	5	3	5	13	15	−2	18	
11	Opatija	13	5	2	6	14	17	−3	17	
12	Vukovar 1991	12	4	2	6	20	23	−3	14	
13	Hrvace	13	4	2	7	12	16	−4	14	
14	Karlovac 1919	12	4	2	6	13	20	−7	14	
15	Dubrava	13	3	4	6	13	16	−3	13	Relegation play-off
16	Dugopolje	13	2	6	5	16	21	−5	12	Relegation to the Second Football League

Updated to match(es) played on 21 November 2026. Source:
Rules for classification: 1) Points; 2) Head-to-head points; 3) Head-to-head goal difference; 4) Head-to-head goals scored (at home if two teams tied); 5) Goal difference; 6) Goals scored; 7) Play-off
(Note: Criteria 2-4 and 7 is only used if deciding champion, teams for promotion or relegation and in that case criteria 6 will not be used).

== Results ==
Home \ Away	BSK	CIB	CRO	DIN	DUB	DUG	HRV	JLP	KAR	KUS	MLA	OPA	ORI	SEG	SES	VUK
BSK Bijelo Brdo		1–1		1–0		2–2	1–2	1–0		2–3			0–0			
Cibalia			0–1		2–1	1–0			2–0	0–0			0–0	1–4		
Croatia Zmijavci	1–0			2–3			3–0				3–1				2–0	2–3
Dinamo II		0–1						0–1	0–1		1–0				1–2	
Dubrava	0–1		1–2							1–2	0–1	2–1			2–2	3–2
Dugopolje			0–1	3–2	0–0				2–2	1–1	0–0	1–2				
Hrvace					0–0	3–0		1–4		1–2			3–0	1–0		
Jadran Luka Ploče					1–1	4–4				1–0		2–2	1–0	1–1		
Karlovac 1919	3–2				0–1		3–1					2–1	0–2			1–4
Kustošija			1–0	0–1							1–2		2–0			
Mladost Ždralovi		2–1					1–0	1–0	1–0					1–3	1–0	1–1
Opatija	2–3		1–1	1–2			1–0			1–1	0–3				1–0	1–0
Orijent				3–0	2–1							1–0			0–2	3–2
Segesta	4–1		2–0	1–3		2–1		1–1	1–1	0–0		0–1	3–1			
Sesvete		1–2				1–2	0–0		3–0					2–0		
Vukovar 1991	0–2	1–1		2–6			1–0	2–3						2–0		

Updated to match(es) played on 21 November 2026. Source: Prva NL (in Croatian)
Legend: Blue = home team win; Yellow = draw; Red = away team win.
