= 2015–16 Croatian Third Football League =

The 2015–16 Treća HNL season is the 25th since its establishment. The first matches of the season will be played on 22 August 2015, and the season will end on 4 June 2016.

== Overview before the season ==
50 teams will join the league, including one relegated from the 2014–15 Druga HNL and six promoted from the lower leagues.

Relegated from 2014–15 Druga HNL

- Pomorac (Druga HNL→club is dissolved)
- Bistra (Druga HNL→Unified League of Zagreb County)

Promoted from 2014–15 Inter-county leagues and County leagues

- Marsonia (Inter-county league of East→Treća HNL East)
- Krk (Inter-county league of Rijeka→Treća HNL West)
- Opatija (Inter-county league of Rijeka→Treća HNL West)
- Vinogradar (Inter-county league of Center→Treća HNL West)
- OŠK Otok (First League of Split-Dalmatia County→Treća HNL South)
- Primorac B/M (First League of Zadar county→Treća HNL South)

== Groups ==
=== East ===
Treća HNL East
- Season: 2015–16
- Champions: Međimurje
- Matches: 240
- Goals: 729 (3.04 per match)
- Top goalscorer: 21 goals Nikola Valjak(Podravina)
- Biggest home win: Bjelovar 6−0 Slavonija; Bjelovar 6−0 Mladost Antin; Belišće 7−1 Podravina
- Biggest away win: Mladost Antin 1−10 Slavonija
- Highest scoring: Belišće 9−4 Mladost Antin
- All statistics correct as of 4 June 2016.

==== Stadia and locations ====
Location of teams in 2015–16 Treća HNL East

Team	Home city	Stadium	Capacity
Belišće	Belišće	Gradski stadion	5,000
Bjelovar	Bjelovar	Gradski stadion	4,000
BSK	Bijelo Brdo	Igralište BSK-a	1,000
Đakovo Croatia	Đakovo	Stadion na Pazarištu	3,000
Koprivnica	Koprivnica	Gradski stadion	3,500
Marsonia	Slavonski Brod	Stadion uz Savu	8,000
Međimurje	Čakovec	SRC Mladost	6,000
Mladost Antin	Antin	Paža	500
Mladost Ždralovi	Ždralovi	Igralište NK Mladosti	1,000
Oriolik	Oriovac	Igralište NK Oriolika	1,500
Podravina	Ludbreg	Igralište NK Podravine	5,000
Slavija	Pleternica	Stadion Stjepan Zdenko Šivo	700
Slavonija	Požega	Stadion kraj Orljave	4,000
Varaždin	Varaždin	Stadion Anđelko Herjavec	9,099
Višnjevac	Višnjevac	Stadion NK Višnjevca	1,500
Vukovar '91	Vukovar	Gradski stadion	6,000

==== League table ====
Pos	Team	Pld	W	D	L	GF	GA	GD	Pts	Qualification or relegation
1	Međimurje (C)	30	20	6	4	62	15	+47	66	Promotion to 2016–17 Druga HNL
2	Bjelovar	30	17	6	7	61	29	+32	57	
3	Slavija	30	17	6	7	49	35	+14	57	
4	Belišće	30	16	6	8	58	30	+28	54	
5	Marsonia	30	16	6	8	42	24	+18	54	
6	BSK	30	14	10	6	56	40	+16	52	
7	Mladost Ždralovi	30	16	4	10	47	37	+10	52	
8	Slavonija	30	13	4	13	59	51	+8	43	
9	Vukovar '91	30	13	3	14	48	50	−2	42	
10	Oriolik	30	10	7	13	29	38	−9	37	
11	Varaždin	30	10	4	16	40	47	−7	34	
12	Đakovo Croatia	30	8	10	12	34	48	−14	34	
13	Koprivnica	30	9	6	15	43	56	−13	33	
14	Višnjevac	30	8	8	14	46	56	−10	32	
15	Podravina (R)	30	5	6	19	36	74	−38	21	Relegation to 2016–17 Inter-county league
16	Mladost Antin (R)	30	1	2	27	19	99	−80	5	Relegation to 2016–17 Inter-county league

Updated to match(es) played on 4 June 2016. Source: Croatian Football Federation (in Croatian)
Rules for classification: 1) Points; 2) Head-to-head points; 3) Head-to-head goal difference; 4) Head-to-head goals scored (at away if two teams tied); 5) Goal difference; 6) Goals scored; 7) Play-off
(Note: Criteria 2-4 and 7 is only used if deciding Champion, or teams for relegation and in that case criteria 6 will not be used).
(C) Champions; (R) Relegated

==== Results ====
Home \ Away	BEL	BJE	BSK	ĐAK	KOP	MAR	MEĐ	MLA	MLŽ	ORI	POD	SLA	SLO	VAR	VIŠ	VUK
Belišće		3–2	5–0	1–1	4–1	1–0	0–1	9–4	1–0	4–0	7–1	1–0	2–0	2–0	0–0	1–2
Bjelovar	1–0		3–1	2–0	4–1	2–0	0–2	6–0	1–1	0–0	0–2	3–0	6–0	1–0	2–1	3–0
BSK Bijelo Brdo	1–3	3–1		2–1	3–0	4–2	0–0	5–1	3–1	0–0	0–0	4–0	3–1	0–0	3–2	2–1
Đakovo-Croatia	0–0	4–2	0–2		2–1	0–3	1–1	1–1	1–1	3–1	2–2	2–0	2–2	2–1	1–1	1–0
Koprivnica	1–1	0–1	2–2	1–2		0–0	0–6	3–0	4–0	0–0	1–1	1–0	1–1	1–3	6–1	2–4
Marsonia	4–1	0–1	1–0	2–1	2–1		1–0	3–1	2–1	0–0	2–0	2–1	3–0	1–0	0–0	4–1
Međimurje	2–0	1–1	3–3	3–0	5–0	0–0		3–1	3–0	2–0	1–0	5–0	3–1	3–0	1–0	4–0
Mladost Antin	1–2	0–1	0–1	0–1	0–4	0–4	0–2		1–2	0–1	1–3	0–2	1–10	0–8	0–2	3–2
Mladost Ždralovi	1–0	2–0	1–0	3–1	1–0	2–0	1–0	3–0		2–0	3–0	0–1	2–0	3–0	2–2	3–2
Oriolik	0–2	1–3	2–2	2–1	1–2	0–0	3–0	2–0	2–1		1–0	0–1	1–0	0–2	2–1	4–2
Podravina	0–1	0–4	0–3	1–1	3–1	1–1	0–4	2–2	2–3	1–2		0–3	3–4	0–3	4–3	4–3
Slavija Pleternica	1–1	2–0	3–3	1–0	1–3	1–0	2–2	3–0	1–1	3–1	1–0		3–1	3–0	5–2	2–2
Slavonija	1–2	1–1	2–1	4–1	0–4	0–1	1–0	6–1	3–1	2–1	3–1	0–0		4–1	7–2	3–0
Varaždin	1–3	1–1	1–2	5–0	0–0	2–1	0–2	3–0	3–2	1–1	1–3	0–4	2–0		1–5	0–1
Višnjevac	1–1	2–2	2–2	2–1	2–0	0–0	0–1	4–1	1–3	2–1	3–1	0–1	0–2	0–1		5–1
Vukovar '91	1–0	1–0	1–1	1–1	5–0	1–2	0–2	1–0	3–0	1–0	3–1	1–2	2–0	2–0	4–0	

Updated to match(es) played on 4 June 2016. Source: soccerway.com
Legend: Blue = home team win; Yellow = draw; Red = away team win.

=== South ===
Treća HNL South
- Season: 2015–16
- Champions: Solin
- Promoted: Solin
- Matches: 306
- Goals: 819 (2.68 per match)
- Top goalscorer: 22 goals Šime-Josip Pedišić (Val)
- Biggest home win: Hajduk II 5−0 Mosor; Hrvace 5−0 Jadran LP; Omiš 6−1 Croatia Zmijavci
- Biggest away win: Kamen Ivanbegovina 0−4 Hajduk II; OŠK Otok 0−4 Junak; Mosor 0−4 Val
- Highest scoring: Kamen Ivanbegovina 5−3 Val
- All statistics correct as of 4 June 2016.

==== Stadia and locations ====
Location of teams in 2015–16 Treća HNL South

Team	Home city	Stadium	Capacity
BŠK Zmaj	Blato	Zlinje	3,000
Croatia Zmijavci	Zmijavci	ŠRC Marijan Šuto Mrma	1,000
Hajduk II	Split	Poljud	34,448
Hrvace	Hrvace	Gradski stadion	3,075
Jadran LP	Ploče	Igralište NK Jadrana	2,000
Junak	Sinj	Gradski stadion	3,096
Kamen Ivanbegovina	Ivanbegovina	Igralište NK Kamena	1,000
Mosor	Split	Stadion u Pricviću	3,000
Neretva	Metković	Igralište iza Vage	2,000
Neretvanac	Opuzen	Podvornica	2,500
Omiš	Omiš	Stadion Anđelko Marušić-Ferata	5,000
OŠK Otok	Otok	Igralište NK Otok	450
Primorac B/M	Biograd na Moru	Gradski stadion Kazimir i Silvio	1,500
Primorac 1929	Stobreč	Igralište u Blatu	3,600
Solin	Solin	Stadion pokraj Jadra	5,000
Val	Kaštel Stari	Vukovar	2,000
Zagora	Unešić	Borovište	3,000
Zmaj Makarska	Makarska	Gradski sportski centar	5,000

==== League table ====
Pos	Team	Pld	W	D	L	GF	GA	GD	Pts	Qualification or relegation
1	Solin (C, P)	34	21	5	8	46	26	+20	68	Promotion to 2016–17 Druga HNL
2	Neretvanac	34	18	9	7	61	40	+21	63	
3	Val	34	17	4	13	57	52	+5	55	
4	Kamen Ivanbegovina	34	16	3	15	52	51	+1	51	
5	Hajduk II	34	14	8	12	45	36	+9	50	
6	BŠK Zmaj	34	14	8	12	64	57	+7	50	
7	Hrvace	34	14	7	13	55	43	+12	49	
8	Omiš	34	12	10	12	39	33	+6	46	
9	OŠK Otok	34	14	4	16	40	45	−5	46	
10	Junak	34	11	12	11	42	38	+4	45	
11	Primorac 1929	34	11	11	12	39	47	−8	44	
12	Neretva	34	12	8	14	39	49	−10	44	
13	Zmaj Makarska	34	12	6	16	42	45	−3	42	
14	Croatia Zmijavci	34	12	6	16	52	60	−8	42	
15	Primorac B/M	34	11	8	15	36	42	−6	41	
16	Jadran LP	34	10	9	15	31	49	−18	39	
17	Zagora (R)	34	10	9	15	42	54	−12	39	Relegation to 2016–17 County league
18	Mosor (R)	34	8	11	15	37	56	−19	35	Relegation to 2016–17 County league

Updated to match(es) played on 4 June 2016. Source: Croatian Football Federation, soccerway.com
Rules for classification: 1) Points; 2) Head-to-head points; 3) Head-to-head goal difference; 4) Head-to-head goals scored (at away if two teams tied); 5) Goal difference; 6) Goals scored; 7) Play-off
(Note: Criteria 2-4 and 7 is only used if deciding Champion, or teams for relegation and in that case criteria 6 will not be used).
(C) Champions; (P) Promoted; (R) Relegated

==== Results ====
Home \ Away	BŠK	CRO	HAJ	HRV	JAD	JUN	KAM	MOS	NEA	NEC	OMI	OŠK	PBM	PRI	SOL	VAL	ZAG	ZMA
BŠK Zmaj		4–2	3–2	3–3	4–0	2–1	4–1	2–2	2–0	2–3	4–2	3–0	3–1	2–2	3–0	1–2	2–1	3–2
Croatia Zmijavci	4–2		3–1	3–2	1–1	1–1	4–1	2–2	0–0	2–4	0–1	3–1	0–1	3–0	1–2	1–0	5–1	2–2
Hajduk II	1–1	2–0		1–2	1–0	2–2	3–0	5–0	3–0	2–1	2–2	0–1	2–3	2–0	0–1	4–0	0–0	1–0
Hrvace	4–1	3–2	2–0		5–0	2–3	0–1	3–0	5–2	3–1	1–0	3–0	0–0	1–2	1–1	2–0	0–0	0–0
Jadran LP	1–0	2–0	1–2	1–0		1–0	1–1	3–1	3–1	1–1	1–0	1–1	1–0	1–2	0–1	0–3	0–0	2–5
Junak	3–0	3–1	0–0	2–0	2–2		2–1	0–0	3–1	1–1	0–0	1–2	1–0	2–0	1–1	2–1	3–1	1–2
Kamen Ivanbegovina	4–2	0–1	0–4	1–0	1–2	2–0		2–0	0–0	3–0	1–0	1–0	3–2	3–1	4–0	5–3	3–1	2–0
Mosor	2–2	1–3	1–2	2–1	1–0	1–1	2–1		2–0	1–0	2–0	4–2	0–0	2–2	0–1	0–4	1–1	0–0
Neretva	3–1	1–0	1–0	3–1	2–0	0–0	3–1	2–1		1–1	1–1	4–2	1–1	1–0	0–1	2–2	2–0	4–1
Neretvanac	2–0	4–1	1–1	2–1	1–1	4–0	3–1	1–1	5–1		3–1	0–0	2–1	5–1	0–0	1–0	2–1	1–0
Omiš	1–0	6–1	1–1	0–0	0–1	1–0	0–0	2–1	4–0	1–1		2–1	1–1	2–1	1–0	2–2	4–1	1–0
OŠK Otok	3–1	3–0	0–1	3–0	1–0	0–4	2–1	2–1	1–0	1–2	1–0		2–0	1–0	1–0	3–1	2–2	0–1
Primorac B/M	0–1	1–1	2–0	2–0	3–0	1–0	3–0	3–1	1–1	0–1	1–0	1–0		0–2	0–2	2–3	2–1	1–1
Primorac 1929	3–3	1–0	1–1	1–0	0–0	1–0	1–0	3–3	2–0	2–2	2–0	0–0	1–1		0–3	2–0	3–0	1–4
Solin	1–0	0–1	2–0	1–2	2–1	1–1	2–0	4–1	1–0	3–2	2–1	1–0	2–0	0–0		2–0	1–1	2–1
Val	0–0	2–1	1–2	2–2	3–1	1–0	3–1	1–0	3–1	2–0	0–2	4–3	4–0	3–1	1–0		3–2	1–0
Zagora	0–2	4–1	2–1	1–2	2–2	1–1	0–2	1–0	0–1	3–1	1–0	2–1	3–2	1–1	0–3	3–1		2–0
Zmaj Makarska	1–1	1–2	2–0	2–4	2–0	4–1	2–5	0–1	1–0	0–1	0–0	1–0	2–0	1–0	0–2	4–1	0–3	

Updated to match(es) played on 4 June 2016. Source: soccerway.com
Legend: Blue = home team win; Yellow = draw; Red = away team win.

=== West ===
Treća HNL West
- Season: 2015–16
- Champions: Novigrad
- Promoted: Novigrad
- Matches: 240
- Goals: 625 (2.6 per match)
- Top goalscorer: 19 goals Marko Bjelanović(Novigrad)
- Biggest home win: Zagorec 6−0 HAŠK
- Biggest away win: Stupnik 0−6 Vinogradar; Stupnik 0−6 Novigrad
- Highest scoring: Rijeka II 5−3 Dubrava; Dugo Selo 3−5 Samobor
- All statistics correct as of 28 May 2016.

==== Stadia and locations ====
Location of teams in 2015–16 Treća HNL West

Team	Home city	Stadium	Capacity
Dubrava	Zagreb	ŠRC Grana-Klaka	2,000
Dugo Selo	Dugo Selo	Gradski stadion	2,000
HAŠK	Zagreb	ŠRC Pešćenica	3,000
Krk	Krk	SRC Josip Uravić Pepi	500
Maksimir	Zagreb	Oboj	247
Novigrad	Novigrad	Lako	2,300
Opatija	Opatija	Stadion NK Opatije	2,000
Rijeka II	Rijeka	Stadion Rujevica	5,786
Samobor	Samobor	SC NK Samobor	5,000
Stupnik	Gornji Stupnik	SRC Stupnik	1,000
Špansko	Zagreb	Stadion NK Špansko	1,000
Trnje	Zagreb	Stadion Trnja	1,000
Vinogradar	Jastrebarsko	Mladina	2,000
Vrapče	Zagreb	Igralište Vrapča	1,000
Vrbovec	Vrbovec	Gradski stadion kraj Sajmišta	4,000
Zagorec	Krapina	ŠRC Podgora	2,000

==== League table ====
Pos	Team	Pld	W	D	L	GF	GA	GD	Pts	Qualification or relegation
1	Novigrad (C, P)	30	23	6	1	59	19	+40	75	Promotion to 2016–17 Druga HNL
2	Vinogradar	30	17	9	4	65	23	+42	60	
3	Trnje	30	17	4	9	44	29	+15	55	
4	Samobor	30	13	9	8	49	37	+12	48	
5	Zagorec	30	15	3	12	40	35	+5	48	
6	Krk	30	13	8	9	41	28	+13	47	
7	Vrapče	30	13	7	10	44	41	+3	46	
8	Maksimir	30	13	4	13	40	34	+6	43	
9	Opatija	30	13	4	13	39	45	−6	43	
10	Rijeka II	30	13	3	14	43	49	−6	42	Dissolved at the end of the season
11	Dubrava	30	8	9	13	35	39	−4	33	
12	HAŠK	30	8	6	16	22	43	−21	30	
13	Dugo Selo	30	6	11	13	37	47	−10	29	
14	Vrbovec	30	5	9	16	20	43	−23	24	
15	Stupnik	30	5	9	16	24	54	−30	24	
16	Špansko (R)	30	5	5	20	23	59	−36	20	Relegation to 2016–17 Inter-county league

Updated to match(es) played on 28 May 2016. Source: Croatian Football Federation (in Croatian), soccerway.com
Rules for classification: 1) Points; 2) Head-to-head points; 3) Head-to-head goal difference; 4) Head-to-head goals scored (at away if two teams tied); 5) Goal difference; 6) Goals scored; 7) Play-off
(Note: Criteria 2-4 and 7 is only used if deciding Champion, or teams for relegation and in that case criteria 6 will not be used).
(C) Champions; (P) Promoted; (R) Relegated

==== Results ====
Home \ Away	DUB	DUG	HAŠ	KRK	MAK	NOV	OPA	RIJ	SAM	STU	ŠPA	TRN	VIN	VRA	VRB	ZAG
Dubrava		2–1	0–0	0–2	1–1	0–1	4–1	3–0	0–0	2–2	0–2	0–2	0–0	1–1	1–0	1–0
Dugo Selo	2–4		1–2	2–2	1–0	0–1	2–1	1–3	3–5	0–0	4–1	1–0	1–1	1–2	2–0	2–0
HAŠK	0–0	0–0		0–1	0–2	0–2	1–2	0–1	2–1	3–2	2–0	2–0	0–0	1–2	2–0	1–2
Krk	2–2	1–1	2–1		2–0	4–2	1–2	0–1	1–1	4–0	5–1	0–2	2–0	1–0	0–0	1–0
Maksimir	2–1	2–2	1–0	2–0		1–2	3–0	2–1	1–1	3–0	3–0	0–1	1–0	2–3	1–0	1–0
Novigrad	2–1	1–1	4–1	3–1	2–1		2–0	1–0	4–1	4–2	1–0	1–0	1–1	2–0	1–0	1–0
Opatija	1–0	3–1	2–0	1–0	2–1	0–3		2–0	1–1	1–0	2–0	1–1	0–4	3–0	2–2	3–1
Rijeka	5–3	2–2	2–0	1–0	3–0	1–1	0–0		1–2	2–1	3–2	4–0	0–2	2–3	0–4	1–2
Samobor	0–2	3–3	2–0	1–0	1–0	0–3	3–1	4–1		1–0	2–0	3–0	1–3	4–3	3–0	5–1
Stupnik	1–1	2–1	0–0	0–1	1–0	0–6	1–0	2–3	2–1		4–1	0–0	0–6	0–0	1–1	0–1
Špansko	1–0	1–1	0–1	0–3	3–1	0–0	2–3	2–0	2–1	0–0		1–4	1–1	0–4	0–0	0–1
Trnje	2–1	3–0	2–1	2–1	3–2	0–1	2–1	2–0	0–0	4–0	1–0		2–2	0–1	2–0	2–1
Vinogradar	2–0	2–0	4–0	1–0	2–0	2–2	4–1	5–0	0–0	2–1	6–1	2–0		2–5	2–0	1–2
Vrapče	2–0	1–0	0–0	2–2	1–3	1–1	2–1	1–4	1–1	3–1	2–1	0–2	1–3		2–0	0–1
Vrbovec	0–3	0–0	1–2	1–1	0–2	0–2	1–3	1–0	1–1	3–1	1–0	1–5	1–1	0–0		1–3
Zagorec	4–2	2–1	6–0	0–0	1–1	1–2	2–0	1–2	1–0	0–0	3–1	2–0	0–4	2–1	0–1	

Updated to match(es) played on 28 May 2016. Source: soccerway.com
Legend: Blue = home team win; Yellow = draw; Red = away team win.

== See also ==
- 2015–16 Croatian First Football League
- 2015–16 Croatian Second Football League
- 2015–16 Croatian Football Cup
