= 2024–25 First Football League (Croatia) =

Prva nogometna liga
- Season: 2024–25
- Dates: 16 August 2024 – 31 May 2025
- Champions: Vukovar 1991
- Promoted: Vukovar 1991
- Relegated: Zrinski Osječko
- Top goalscorer: Dominik Mulac (7 goals)
- All statistics correct as of 27 October 2024.

The 2024–25 First Football League (also known as Prva nogometna liga and 1. NL) was the 34th season of the second-level football competition for men's association football teams in Croatia, since its establishment in 1992. The league was contested by 12 teams and played in a triple round robin format. This is the third season that the second level of men's football in Croatia is named First football league (Prva nogometna liga).

== Teams ==
=== Changes ===
Šibenik was promoted to the 2024–25 HNL, while Solin was relegated to 2024–25 Druga NL.

Newcomer from higher level (HNL) is Rudeš. Newcomers from lower level (2. NL) are champions Opatija.

=== Stadia and locations ===
Locations of teams in 2024–25 Prva NL

Team	City	Stadium	Capacity
BSK Bijelo Brdo	Bijelo Brdo	Stadion BSK	1,200
Cibalia	Vinkovci	Stadion Cibalia	9,958
Croatia Zmijavci	Zmijavci	Stadion Marijan Šuto Mrma	2,000
Dubrava	Zagreb	Stadion NŠC Stjepan Spajić	5,000
Dugopolje	Dugopolje	Stadion Hrvatski vitezovi	5,200
Jarun	Zagreb	Ivan Laljak-Ivić Stadium	5,228
Opatija	Opatija	Stadion Kantrida	10,600
Orijent	Rijeka	Stadion Krimeja	3,500
Rudeš	Zagreb	Stadion SC Rudeš	2,500
Sesvete	Sesvete	Stadion Sveti Josip radnik	2,000
Vukovar 1991	Vukovar	Stadion u Borovu naselju	3,550
Zrinski Osječko 1664	Jurjevac Punitovački	Stadion Gradski vrt	17,061

Rank	Counties of Croatia	Number of teams	Club(s)
1	City of Zagreb	4	Dubrava, Jarun, Rudeš, Sesvete
2	Split-Dalmatia	2	Croatia Zmijavci, Dugopolje
2	Osijek-Baranja	2	BSK Bijelo Brdo, Zrinski Jurjevac
2	Vukovar-Syrmia	2	Cibalia, Vukovar 1991
2	Primorje-Gorski Kotar	2	Opatija, Orijent

== League table ==
Pos	Team	Pld	W	D	L	GF	GA	GD	Pts	Qualification or relegation
1	Vukovar 1991 (C, P)	33	21	9	3	55	14	+41	72	Promotion to the Croatian Football League
2	Opatija	33	19	11	3	48	20	+28	68	
3	Orijent	33	14	14	5	46	31	+15	56	
4	Sesvete	33	14	7	12	36	32	+4	49	
5	Cibalia	33	12	10	11	47	39	+8	46	
6	Dubrava	33	14	4	15	35	36	−1	46	
7	BSK Bijelo Brdo	33	13	7	13	40	42	−2	46	
8	Croatia Zmijavci	33	10	10	13	33	43	−10	40	
9	Rudeš	33	10	9	14	31	33	−2	39	
10	Jarun	33	9	10	14	33	39	−6	37	
11	Dugopolje	33	6	13	14	33	52	−19	31	Relegation play-off
12	Zrinski Osječko 1664 (R)	33	1	6	26	15	71	−56	9	Relegation to the Second Football League

Source: Prva NL
Rules for classification: 1) Points; 2) Head-to-head points; 3) Head-to-head goal difference; 4) Head-to-head goals scored (at home if two teams tied); 5) Goal difference; 6) Goals scored; 7) Play-off
(Note: Criteria 2-4 and 7 is only used if deciding champion, teams for promotion or relegation and in that case criteria 6 will not be used).
(C) Champions; (P) Promoted; (R) Relegated

== Results ==
Home \ Away	BSK	CIB	CRO	DUB	DUG	JAR	OPA	ORI	RUD	SES	VUK	ZRI
BSK Bijelo Brdo	—	0–4	2–2	1–1	1–1	0–2	0–2	0–0	1–0	1–2	1–1	1–0
Cibalia	1–0	—	3–3	1–2	2–1	1–1	0–1	1–1	2–0	0–0	1–0	5–0
Croatia Zmijavci	0–1	2–1	—	3–1	1–0	1–0	0–0	1–1	0–0	0–4	1–0	2–2
Dubrava	3–0	1–0	0–1	—	2–0	1–0	2–1	0–3	1–0	0–0	1–2	1–0
Dugopolje	0–0	1–1	0–0	2–1	—	0–0	2–2	1–1	2–3	0–0	0–1	3–3
Jarun	0–1	1–2	1–1	3–1	2–2	—	0–1	1–2	1–2	1–2	1–1	2–1
Opatija	5–0	1–1	2–1	0–0	2–0	2–1	—	2–0	1–0	0–0	0–0	2–1
Orijent	3–2	2–1	0–0	2–0	2–0	1–1	0–0	—	1–1	0–1	0–1	2–2
Rudeš	1–0	1–0	2–1	1–2	1–2	1–1	1–2	2–0	—	2–0	0–1	1–0
Sesvete	1–3	2–1	3–2	3–0	3–1	0–1	1–1	3–3	1–0	—	0–1	1–0
Vukovar 1991	1–1	2–0	4–0	1–0	5–0	0–0	1–1	0–1	1–1	1–0	—	3–0
Zrinski Jurjevac	0–1	1–3	0–1	0–1	0–2	0–2	0–0	2–0	1–1	0–0	1–3	—

Source: Prva NL (in Croatian)
Legend: Blue = home team win; Yellow = draw; Red = away team win.
For upcoming matches, an "a" indicates there is an article about the rivalry between the two participants.

Home \ Away	BSK	CIB	CRO	DUB	DUG	JAR	OPA	ORI	RUD	SES	VUK	ZRI
BSK Bijelo Brdo	—	2–3	—	2–1	3–1	—	0–1	—	2–0	—	—	—
Cibalia	—	—	0–0	1–2	—	1–1	0–2	—	3–1	—	—	1–0
Croatia Zmijavci	1–3	—	—	—	4–1	0–1	—	—	0–4	—	—	3–0 (Note: Match awarded after Zrinski Jurjevac was expelled from the championship.)
Dubrava	—	—	1–0	—	—	0–1	1–2	0–1	0–0	—	—	5–0
Dugopolje	—	1–1	—	2–1	—	2–1	1–4	—	0–0	—	—	—
Jarun	0–5	—	—	—	—	—	—	1–4	—	0–2	0–0	3–0
Opatija	—	—	2–1	—	—	2–1	—	2–3	1–1	1–0	—	3–0
Orijent	2–1	2–2	2–0	—	1–1	—	—	—	—	2–0	1–1	—
Rudeš	—	—	—	—	—	0–2	—	0–0	—	1–3	0–1	3–0
Sesvete	0–1	1–2	0–1	1–3	1–0	—	—	—	—	—	0–3	—
Vukovar 1991	2–0	4–2	2–0	2–1	3–0	—	1–0	—	—	—	—	—
Zrinski Jurjevac	0–3	—	—	—	0–3	—	—	1–3	—	0–1	1–6	—

Source: Prva NL (in Croatian)
Legend: Blue = home team win; Yellow = draw; Red = away team win.
For upcoming matches, an "a" indicates there is an article about the rivalry between the two participants.

== Attendances ==
#	Club	Average
1	Vukovar	566
2	Orijent	474
3	Cibalia	444
4	Opatija	374
5	Zmijavci	351
6	Bijelo Brdo	304
7	Rudeš	287
8	Sesvete	282
9	Jarun	258
10	Zrinski	250
11	Dugopolje	228
12	Dubrava	188
