= 2022–23 First Football League (Croatia) =

Prva nogometna liga
- Season: 2022–23
- Dates: 13 August 2022 – 3 June 2023
- Promoted: Rudeš
- Relegated: Hrvatski Dragovoljac, Kustošija
- Matches: 198
- Goals: 497 (2.51 per match)
- Top goalscorer: Ivor Ljubanović (14)
- Biggest home win: 6–0, BSK Bijelo Brdo v Solin (1 Apr 2023)
- Biggest away win: 0–4, multiple
- Highest scoring: 7 goals, multiple
- All statistics correct as of 22 May 2023.

The 2022–23 First Football League (also known as Prva nogometna liga and 1. NL) was the 32nd season of the second-level football competition for men's association football teams in Croatia, since its establishment in 1992. The season started on 13 August 2022 and concluded on 3 June 2023.

The league was contested by 12 teams, four less than the previous season, and played in a triple round robin format.

This was the first season that the second level of men's football in Croatia was named First football league (Prva nogometna liga).

== Teams ==
=== Changes ===
Varaždin was promoted to the 2022–23 HNL, while Croatia Zmijavci, Osijek II, Sesvete and Opatija were relegated to 2022–23 Druga NL. Dinamo Zagreb II was disbanded.

New clubs were Hrvatski Dragovoljac (relegated after single season in the top flight), relegated from 2021–22 Prva HNL and Vukovar 1991, winner of playoff between winners of five third tier leagues.

Before the start of the season, Inter Zaprešić ended up in bankruptcy and was dissolved. Instead of them, Croatia Zmijavci, originally relegated, was returned to the league.

=== Stadia and locations ===
Locations of teams in 2022–23 Prva NL

Team	City	Stadium	Capacity
BSK Bijelo Brdo	Bijelo Brdo	Stadion BSK	1,200
Cibalia	Vinkovci	Stadion Cibalia	9,958
Croatia Zmijavci	Zmijavci	Stadion Marijan Šuto Mrma	2,000
Dubrava	Zagreb	Stadion Kustošija	2,550
Dugopolje	Dugopolje	Stadion Hrvatski vitezovi	5,200
Hrvatski Dragovoljac	Zagreb	Stadion NŠC Stjepan Spajić	4,500
Jarun	Zagreb	Stadion Lučko	1,500
Kustošija	Zagreb	Stadion Kustošija	2,550
Orijent	Rijeka	Stadion Krimeja	3,500
Rudeš	Zagreb	Stadion SC Rudeš	2,500
Solin	Solin	Stadion Hrvatski vitezovi	5,200
Vukovar 1991	Vukovar	Stadion u Borovu naselju	3,550

Rank	Counties of Croatia	Number of teams	Club(s)
1	City of Zagreb	5	Dubrava, Hrvatski Dragovoljac, Jarun, Kustošija, Rudeš
2	Split-Dalmatia	3	Croatia Zmijavci, Dugopolje, Solin
3	Vukovar-Syrmia	2	Cibalia, Vukovar 1991
4	Osijek-Baranja	1	BSK Bijelo Brdo
4	Primorje-Gorski Kotar	1	Orijent

== League table ==
Pos	Team	Pld	W	D	L	GF	GA	GD	Pts	Qualification or relegation
1	Rudeš (C, P)	33	19	7	7	56	26	+30	64	Promotion to the Croatian Football League
2	Vukovar 1991	33	17	12	4	57	25	+32	63	
3	Cibalia	33	13	15	5	37	26	+11	54	
4	BSK Bijelo Brdo	33	12	8	13	41	37	+4	44	
5	Jarun	33	13	5	15	43	57	−14	44	
6	Orijent	33	10	13	10	45	45	0	43	
7	Croatia Zmijavci	33	12	7	14	37	44	−7	43	
8	Solin	33	12	7	14	47	55	−8	43	
9	Dubrava	33	11	9	13	38	39	−1	42	
10	Dugopolje	33	9	14	10	30	35	−5	41	
11	Kustošija (R)	33	9	7	17	35	50	−15	34	Relegation play-off
12	Hrvatski Dragovoljac (R)	33	4	10	19	31	58	−27	22	Relegation to the Second Football League

Updated to match(es) played on 5 June 2023. Source: Prva NL
Rules for classification: 1) Points; 2) Head-to-head points; 3) Head-to-head goal difference; 4) Head-to-head goals scored (at home if two teams tied); 5) Goal difference; 6) Goals scored; 7) Play-off
(Note: Criteria 2-4 and 7 is only used if deciding champion, teams for promotion or relegation and in that case criteria 6 will not be used).
(C) Champions; (P) Promoted; (R) Relegated

== Results ==
Home \ Away	BSK	CIB	CRO	DUB	DUG	HRV	JAR	KUS	ORI	RUD	SOL	VUK
BSK Bijelo Brdo	—	0–0	4–0	1–1	1–1	1–2	2–1	0–1	0–0	0–1	2–1	1–1
Cibalia	4–0	—	0–0	1–0	1–1	2–1	1–0	2–2	1–0	1–0	0–0	2–2
Croatia Zmijavci	2–0	0–2	—	2–0	0–2	3–1	2–1	1–1	2–2	2–1	0–1	1–2
Dubrava	0–1	0–2	2–1	—	2–0	1–0	0–1	5–2	5–0	1–1	4–1	0–0
Dugopolje	2–1	0–2	0–2	1–1	—	1–0	0–0	1–0	1–1	0–0	1–0	1–1
Hrvatski Dragovoljac	1–0	0–0	1–1	1–1	1–1	—	0–0	2–3	1–2	0–3 (Note: Game originally ended with 1-0 win for Hrvatski Dragovoljac, but it was later awarded to Rudeš because Hrvatski Dragovoljac did not field enough players younger than 21 as per league rules.)	3–3	0–1
Jarun	3–2	0–0	2–1	3–2	2–0	1–5	—	3–0	2–2	1–3	2–1	2–4
Kustošija	5–2	2–2	2–1	1–0	1–4	2–0	1–2	—	0–0	0–2	2–3	0–0
Orijent	0–0	3–1	0–0	2–2	2–1	2–0	4–3	1–0	—	1–2	1–1	0–0
Rudeš	2–1	4–0	3–1	1–1	1–0	3–0	3–0	1–0	1–0	—	2–0	2–2
Solin	0–3	0–1	4–0	0–2	1–1	3–1	2–0	1–1	2–1	1–0	—	1–0
Vukovar 1991	1–1	1–0	0–1	1–0	0–0	1–1	4–1	3–0	4–0	2–0	4–0	—

Updated to match(es) played on 19 March 2023. Source: Prva NL (in Croatian)
Legend: Blue = home team win; Yellow = draw; Red = away team win.
For upcoming matches, an "a" indicates there is an article about the rivalry between the two participants.

Home \ Away	BSK	CIB	CRO	DUB	DUG	HRV	JAR	KUS	ORI	RUD	SOL	VUK
BSK Bijelo Brdo	—	—	—	—	3–1	—	1–2	1–0	—	—	6–0	2–1
Cibalia	0–0	—	0–0	—	0–0	—	—	—	3–2	1–1	3–1	—
Croatia Zmijavci	2–0	—	—	—	1–2	—	1–0	—	—	—	3–0	2–1
Dubrava	1–2	2–0	1–0	—	1–1	—	—	—	0–3	0–4	—	—
Dugopolje	—	—	—	—	—	1–2	1–0	2–0	2–2	—	0–4	0–1
Hrvatski Dragovoljac	0–2	0–2	2–2	0–1	—	—	—	—	—	2–2	—	—
Jarun	—	2–1	—	1–0	—	3–2	—	2–1	—	0–1	—	—
Kustošija	—	1–1	1–2	0–1	—	3–0	—	—	—	2–1	—	—
Orijent	0–1	—	2–0	—	—	2–2	4–0	2–0	—	—	—	—
Rudeš	1–0	—	4–1	—	1–1	—	—	—	3–1	—	1–2	1–2
Solin	—	—	—	4–0	—	3–0	2–2	0–1	3–3	—	—	2–5
Vukovar 1991	—	1–1	—	1–1	—	3–1	4–1	2–0	2–0	—	—	—

Updated to match(es) played on 5 June 2023. Source: Prva NL (in Croatian)
Legend: Blue = home team win; Yellow = draw; Red = away team win.
For upcoming matches, an "a" indicates there is an article about the rivalry between the two participants.

== Relegation play-offs ==
Team 1	Agg.	Team 2	1st leg	2nd leg
Kustošija	2–2	Zrinski Jurjevac	2–1	0–1

== Attendances ==
#	Club	Average
1	Cibalia	541
2	Zmijavci	522
3	Orijent	473
4	Rudeš	447
5	Vukovar	415
6	Bijelo Brdo	359
7	Dugopolje	312
8	Hrvatski dragovoljac	309
9	Solin	250
10	Jarun	244
11	Dubrava	182
12	Kustošija	165
