= Juraj Ljubić =

Croatian footballer

Personal information
- Date of birth: 26 May 2000 (age 26)
- Place of birth: Mostar, Bosnia and Herzegovina
- Height: 1.80 m (5 ft 11 in)
- Position: Midfielder

Team information
- Current team: BSK Banja Luka (on loan from Lokomotiva)
- Number: 32

Youth career
- 2011–2013: Zrinjski Mostar
- 2013–2014: Maksimir
- 2014–2017: Dinamo Zagreb
- 2017–2018: SPAL
- 2018–2019: Inter Zaprešić

Senior career*
Years	Team	Apps	(Gls)
2018–2020	Inter Zaprešić	15	(0)
2020–2021	Osijek II	15	(0)
2020–2021	Osijek	2	(0)
2021	Zrinjski Mostar	8	(0)
2021–2022	Posušje	10	(0)
2022–2023	Široki Brijeg	2	(0)
2023–2024	Croatia Zmijavci	7	(0)
2024	Jadran Smokvica	3	(0)
2025	Trnje	24	(1)
2026–	Lokomotiva	0	(0)
2026	→ Jarun (loan)	11	(0)
2026–	→ BSK Banja Luka (loan)	11	(0)

International career
2016	Croatia U16	5	(0)
2016–2017	Croatia U17	7	(0)
2018	Croatia U18	2	(0)
2018–2019	Croatia U19	2	(1)
- * Club domestic league appearances and goals as of 1 November 2026

Juraj Ljubić (born 26 May 2000) is a Croatian professional footballer who plays as a midfielder for Bosnian Premier League club BSK Banja Lukaon loan from Lokomotiva Zagreb.

== Club career ==
In January 2020, Ljubić joined Osijek where he started for the clubs reserve team, playing in the Croatian 2. HNL.

On 4 February 2021, he signed a two-and-a-half-year contract with Bosnian Premier League club Zrinjski Mostar. Ljubić made his official debut for the club on 27 February 2021, in a league game against Krupa.

In July 2021, he left Zrinjski and joined Posušje.

== International career ==
Ljubić represented Croatia on various youth levels.

== Career statistics ==
=== Club ===
As of match played 1 November 2026

Appearances and goals by club, season and competition
Club	Season	League			National cup (Note: Includes Croatian Cup, Bosnian Cup)		Total	
Club	Season	Division	Apps	Goals	Apps	Goals	Apps	Goals
Inter Zaprešić	2018–19	1. HNL	5	0	1	0	6	0
Inter Zaprešić	2019–20	1. HNL	10	0	3	0	13	0
Inter Zaprešić	Total		15	0	4	0	19	0
Osijek II	2019–20	2. HNL	3	0	—		3	0
Osijek II	2020–21	2. HNL	12	0	—		12	0
Osijek II	Total		15	0	—		15	0
Osijek	2020–21	1. HNL	2	0	0	0	2	0
Zrinjski Mostar	2020–21	Bosnian Premier League	8	0	0	0	8	0
Posušje	2021–22	Bosnian Premier League	10	0	0	0	10	0
Široki Brijeg	2022–23	Bosnian Premier League	2	0	0	0	2	0
Croatia Zmijavci	2023–24	2. NL	7	0	—		7	0
Jadran Smokvica	2023–24	1. ŽNL	3	0	—		3	0
Trnje	2024–25	2. NL	11	0	—		11	0
Trnje	2025–26	2. NL	13	1	—		13	1
Trnje	Total		24	1	—		24	1
Jarun (loan)	2025–26	1. NL	11	0	—		11	0
BSK Banja Luka (loan)	2026–27	Bosnian Premier League	11	0	1	0	12	0
Career total			108	1	5	0	113	1
