= 2020–21 Croatian Second Football League =

Druga HNL
- Season: 2020–21
- Dates: 13 August 2020 – 29 May 2021
- Champions: Hrvatski Dragovoljac
- Promoted: Hrvatski Dragovoljac
- Relegated: Junak Sinj; Međimurje
- Matches: 306
- Goals: 877 (2.87 per match)
- Top goalscorer: Marko Dabro (30)
- Biggest home win: Osijek II 6–0 Međimurje; Cibalia 6–0 Hrvatski Dragovoljac; BSK Bijelo Brdo 6–0 Međimurje
- Biggest away win: Međimurje 1–6 Hajduk Split II
- Highest scoring: Sesvete 5–4 Orijent 1919
- All statistics correct as of 29 May 2021.

The 2020–21 Croatian Second Football League (also known as Druga HNL and 2. HNL) was the 30th season of the Croatian Second Football League, the second-level football competition for men's association football teams in Croatia, since its establishment in 1992. The season started on 13 August 2020 and ended on 29 May 2021.

The league was contested by 18 teams, two more than the previous season, and played in a double round robin format, with each team playing every other team twice over 34 rounds.

== Teams ==
On 20 May 2020, Croatian Football Federation announced that the first stage of licensing procedure for 2020–21 season was complete. For the 2020–21 Druga HNL, a total of 17 clubs were issued a second level license. In the second stage of licensing procedure clubs that were not licensed in the first round appealed the decision. On 17 June 2020, Croatian Football Federation announced that the licensing procedure for 2020–21 season was complete.

=== Stadia and locations ===
Locations of teams in 2020–21 Druga HNL

Club	Coach	City / Town	Stadium	2019–20 result	Capacity
BSK	(Croatia) Denis Krstanović	Bijelo Brdo	Igralište BSK	14th	500
Cibalia	(Croatia) Petar Tomić	Vinkovci	Stadion HNK Cibalia	16th	10,000
Croatia Zmijavci	(Croatia) Krešimir Režić	Zmijavci	ŠRC Marijan Šuto	2nd	1,000
Dinamo Zagreb II	(Croatia) Ivan Prelec	Zagreb	Stadion Hitrec-Kacian	8th	5,000
Dubrava	(Croatia) Darko Šantek	Zagreb	Stadion NK Kustošija	12th	2,550
Dugopolje	(Croatia) Stipe Balajić	Dugopolje	Stadion Hrvatski vitezovi	10th	5,200
Hajduk Split II	(Croatia) Goran Sablić	Split	Stadion Poljud	6th	35,000
Hrvatski Dragovoljac	(Croatia) Miroslav Kuljanac	Zagreb	Stadion NŠC Stjepan Spajić	9th	5,000
Inter Zaprešić	(Croatia) Tomislav Ivković	Zaprešić	Stadion ŠRC Zaprešić	10th (in Prva HNL)	5,228
Junak Sinj	(Croatia) Stipe Grčić	Sinj	Gradski stadion	1st (in Treća HNL South)	3,096
Kustošija	(Croatia) Ante Ivanda	Zagreb	Stadion NK Kustošija	13th	2,550
Međimurje	(Croatia) Mario Kovačević	Čakovec	Stadion SRC Mladost	11th	6,500
Opatija	(Croatia) Zoran Bogolin	Opatija	Stadion Kantrida	1st (in Treća HNL West)	10,600
Orijent 1919	(Croatia) Damir Milinović	Rijeka	Stadion Krimeja	3rd	3,500
Osijek II	(Croatia) Igor Tolić	Osijek	Stadion Gradski vrt	7th	18,856
Rudeš	(Croatia) Mario Carević	Zagreb	Stadion Kranjčevićeva	5th	10,850
Sesvete	(Croatia) Dino Babić	Zagreb	Stadion sv. Josip Radnik	4th	1,200
Solin	(Bosnia and Herzegovina) Ivan Bubalo	Solin	Stadion pokraj Jadra	15th	4,000

=== Number of teams by county ===
Position	County	Number	Teams
1	City of Zagreb	6	Dinamo Zagreb II, Dubrava, Hrvatski Dragovoljac, Kustošija, Rudeš and Sesvete
2	Split-Dalmatia	5	Croatia Zmijavci, Dugopolje, Hajduk Split II, Junak Sinj and Solin
3	Osijek-Baranja	2	BSK and Osijek II
3	Primorje-Gorski Kotar	2	Opatija and Orijent 1919
5	Međimurje	1	Međimurje
5	Vukovar-Srijem	1	Cibalia
5	Zagreb County	1	Inter Zaprešić

== League table ==
Pos	Team	Pld	W	D	L	GF	GA	GD	Pts	Qualification or relegation (Note: Dinamo Zagreb II, Hajduk Split II and Osijek II are ineligible for promotion)
1	Hrvatski Dragovoljac (C, P)	34	16	11	7	49	39	+10	59	Promotion to the Croatian First Football League
2	Rudeš	34	15	12	7	52	41	+11	57	
3	BSK Bijelo Brdo	34	14	13	7	52	40	+12	55	
4	Cibalia	34	15	6	13	50	43	+7	51	
5	Kustošija	34	12	15	7	43	38	+5	51	
6	Sesvete	34	15	6	13	62	59	+3	51	
7	Opatija	34	12	14	8	42	41	+1	50	
8	Dugopolje	34	13	9	12	49	45	+4	48	
9	Dubrava	34	13	7	14	45	46	−1	46	
10	Inter Zaprešić	34	12	9	13	49	41	+8	45	
11	Orijent 1919	34	12	9	13	52	49	+3	45	
12	Croatia Zmijavci	34	13	5	16	52	53	−1	44	
13	Dinamo Zagreb II	34	12	7	15	45	41	+4	43	
14	Osijek II	34	11	9	14	42	42	0	42	
15	Hajduk Split II (D)	34	11	8	15	58	60	−2	41	Dissolved at the end of the season
16	Solin	34	10	8	16	45	56	−11	38	
17	Junak Sinj (R)	34	7	13	14	46	58	−12	34	Relegation to the Croatian Third Football League
18	Međimurje (R)	34	9	7	18	44	85	−41	34	Relegation to the Croatian Third Football League

Updated to match(es) played on 29 May 2021. Source: Druga-HNL.com
Rules for classification: 1) Points; 2) Head-to-head points; 3) Head-to-head goal difference; 4) Head-to-head goals scored (at home if two teams tied); 5) Goal difference; 6) Goals scored; 7) Play-off
(Note: Criteria 2-4 and 7 is only used if deciding champion, teams for promotion or relegation and in that case criteria 6 will not be used).
(C) Champions; (D) Dissolved; (P) Promoted; (R) Relegated

== Results ==
Home \ Away	BSK	CIB	CRO	DIN	DUB	DUG	HAJ	HRV	INT	JUN	KUS	MEĐ	OPA	ORI	OSI	RUD	SES	SOL
BSK Bijelo Brdo	—	3–1	1–2	1–0	2–0	1–1	2–0	1–0	1–0	2–1	3–3	6–0	1–1	0–3	0–0	1–3	2–1	3–1
Cibalia	0–2	—	3–0	2–1	1–2	2–1	2–1	6–0	1–1	1–2	1–2	3–3	2–0	3–2	2–2	0–2	2–0	1–0
Croatia Zmijavci	0–2	1–1	—	1–4	3–0	3–0	4–0	0–1	2–1	2–2	1–2	4–2	1–3	2–1	1–0	1–1	3–1	1–3
Dinamo Zagreb II	3–0	0–2	1–2	—	1–0	2–0	2–3	0–3	1–1	1–1	1–1	5–2	2–2	3–1	3–0	3–0	0–2	1–0
Dubrava	2–2	0–1	1–1	3–1	—	2–0	2–1	1–2	0–2	3–1	3–3	0–0	1–4	1–2	2–1	0–0	2–1	1–2
Dugopolje	2–0	2–1		1–0	3–1	—	1–0	2–2	1–1	2–2	2–0	4–1	0–0	4–3	0–1	1–3	0–1	3–0
Hajduk Split II	2–2	2–0	2–1	1–0	3–2	1–2	—	2–1	2–2	1–0	1–1	4–0	2–2	3–3	4–3	2–2	2–3	1–2
Hrvatski Dragovoljac	1–1	0–3	1–0	0–2	1–0	2–1	2–1	—	3–2	1–1	1–0	5–0	1–1	1–1	2–1	0–1	3–2	2–1
Inter Zaprešić	2–1	2–0	0–3	2–0	0–1	1–1	3–1	0–0	—	1–0	2–2	1–0	3–0	1–2	0–1	1–2	4–0	4–1
Junak Sinj	2–2	3–2	0–0	0–0	1–2	2–2	2–0	1–4	2–2	—	1–0	4–2	0–2	1–1	1–1	0–2	3–1	1–4
Kustošija	0–0	2–2	4–2	1–0	0–0	1–0	1–3	0–0	0–1	3–2	—	0–0	2–1	1–1	1–0	0–0	1–4	3–2
Međimurje	2–5	1–2	2–1	0–1	2–2	2–1	1–6	1–1	3–2	4–3	0–4	—	3–0	1–3	0–1	4–0	2–2	2–1
Opatija	2–2	0–1	2–3	2–1	2–1	2–1	2–1	0–0	3–2	1–0	0–0	1–1	—	1–1	1–1	0–0	1–0	1–1
Orijent 1919	0–0	2–0	2–1	2–1	0–1	0–1	2–1	2–3	1–0	1–2	1–1	0–1	4–1	—	3–0	2–4	0–2	0–2
Osijek II	3–0	0–0	0–1	1–1	0–5	2–0	1–1	0–0	1–2	2–0	1–0	6–0	1–0	0–0	—	2–3	0–3	2–0
Rudeš	1–1	1–0	2–1	1–2	2–1	0–0	4–2	0–2	1–1	2–2	1–2	6–1	1–2	0–0	1–0	—	2–4	2–2
Sesvete	1–1	1–2	2–1	3–2	1–2	3–3	2–1	4–3	2–1	4–3	0–0	0–1	0–1	5–4	1–5	0–0	—	4–0
Solin	0–1	2–0	4–2	0–0	0–1	2–5	1–1	1–1	2–1	0–0	1–2	1–0	1–1	1–2	4–3	1–2	2–2	—

Updated to match(es) played on 29 May 2021. Source: Druga HNL (in Croatian)
Legend: Blue = home team win; Yellow = draw; Red = away team win.
For upcoming matches, an "a" indicates there is an article about the rivalry between the two participants.

== Statistics ==
=== Top goalscorers ===
As of 29 May 2021

Rank	Player	Club	Goals
1	(Croatia) Marko Dabro	BSK Bijelo Brdo	30
2	(Croatia) Mateo Topić	Sesvete	18
3	(Croatia) Fran Brodić	Kustošija	14
3	(Croatia) Mateo Monjac	Orijent 1919	14
5	(Croatia) Tomislav Mrkonjić	Croatia Zmijavci	13
5	(Croatia) Ivan Šarić	Hajduk Split II	13
7	(North Macedonia) Besart Abdurahimi	Rudeš	12
7	(Croatia) Vedran Gerc	Orijent 1919	12
9	(Croatia) Petar Bačić-Šiško	Junak Sinj	10
9	(Croatia) Stjepan Igrec	Međimurje	10
9	(Croatia) Dragan Juranović	Dubrava	10

== See also ==
- 2020–21 Croatian First Football League
