= 2019–20 Croatian Second Football League =

Druga HNL
- Season: 2019–20
- Dates: 16 August 2019 – 6 May 2020
- Champions: Šibenik
- Promoted: Šibenik
- Matches: 152
- Goals: 378 (2.49 per match)
- Top goalscorer: Mijo Šabić (12)
- Biggest home win: Osijek II 6–0 BSK Bijelo Brdo
- Biggest away win: Cibalia 0–4 Hajduk II; Hrvatski Dragovoljac 0–4 Dubrava
- Highest scoring: Osijek II 6–0 Bijelo Brdo
- Total attendance: 8,176
- Average attendance: 515
- All statistics correct as of 6 May 2020.

The 2019–20 Croatian Second Football League (also known as Druga HNL and 2. HNL) was the 29th season of the Croatian Second Football League, the second-level football competition for men's association football teams in Croatia, since its establishment in 1992. The season started on 16 August 2019 and ended on 6 May 2020.

The league is contested by 16 teams and played in a double round robin format, with each team playing every other team twice over 30 rounds.

== Teams ==
On 25 April 2019, Croatian Football Federation announced that the first stage of licensing procedure for 2019–20 season was completed. For the 2019–20 Druga HNL, clubs that were issued a second level license: BSK, Dinamo Zagreb II, Hajduk Split II, Kustošija, Međimurje, Osijek II, Sesvete, Šibenik. In the second stage of licensing procedure clubs that were not licensed in the first round appealed the decision. On 25 May 2019, all remaining Druga HNL were granted second division license, along with third level clubs Cibalia, Croatia, Dubrava and Orijent 1919.

=== Changes ===
Lučko were relegated from the 2018–19 Druga HNL after finishing last, and Zadar were administratively relegated by the Croatian Football Federation. Varaždin were promoted to the Prva HNL as the champion of the 2018–19 Druga HNL.

Rudeš were relegated from the Prva HNL. Orijent 1919 and Dubrava were promoted from the Treća HNL West, Cibalia were promoted from the Treća HNL East and Croatia Zmijavci were promoted from the Treća HNL South.

=== Stadia and locations ===
Locations of teams in 2019–20 Druga HNL

Club	Coach	City / Town	Stadium	2018–19 result	Capacity
BSK	(Croatia) Denis Krstanović	Bijelo Brdo	Igralište BSK	9th	500
Cibalia	(Croatia) Petar Tomić	Vinkovci	Stadion HNK Cibalia	1st (in Treća HNL East)	10,000
Croatia Zmijavci	(Croatia) Krešimir Režić	Zmijavci	ŠRC Marijan Šuto	2nd (in Treća HNL South)	1,000
Dinamo Zagreb II	(Croatia) Igor Jovićević	Zagreb	Stadion Hitrec-Kacian	7th	5,000
Dubrava	(Croatia) Darko Šantek	Zagreb	Stadion NK Kustošija	2nd (in Treća HNL West)	2,550
Dugopolje	(Croatia) Stipe Balajić	Dugopolje	Stadion Hrvatski vitezovi	5th	5,200
Hajduk Split II	(Croatia) Mario Despotović	Split	Stadion Poljud	4th	35,000
Hrvatski Dragovoljac	(Croatia) Boris Perković	Zagreb	Stadion NŠC Stjepan Spajić	12th	5,000
Kustošija	(Croatia) Ante Ivanda	Zagreb	Stadion NK Kustošija	11th	2,550
Međimurje	(Croatia) Damir Lepen-Jurak	Čakovec	Stadion SRC Mladost	13th	6,500
Orijent 1919	(Croatia) Fausto Budicin	Rijeka	Stadion Krimeja	3rd (in Treća HNL West)	3,500
Osijek II	(Croatia) Ronald Grnja	Osijek	Stadion Gradski vrt	3rd	18,856
Rudeš	(Croatia) Marko Babić	Zagreb	Stadion Kranjčevićeva	10th (in Prva HNL)	10,850
Sesvete	(Croatia) Dino Babić	Zagreb	Stadion sv. Josip Radnik	6th	1,200
Solin	(Bosnia and Herzegovina) Ivan Bubalo	Solin	Stadion pokraj Jadra	10th	4,000
Šibenik	(Croatia) Krunoslav Rendulić	Šibenik	Stadion Šubićevac	2nd	3,412

=== Managerial changes ===
Team	Outgoing manager	Manner of departure	Date of vacancy	Replaced by	Date of appointment	Position in table
Šibenik	(Croatia) Borimir Perković	Sacked	5 June 2019	(Croatia) Krunoslav Rendulić	20 June 2019	Pre-season
Rudeš	(Croatia) Tomislav Ivković	Sacked	27 June 2019	(Croatia) Mirko Labrović	27 June 2019	Pre-season
Međimurje	(Croatia) Matija Kristić	Sacked	2 September 2019	(Croatia) Damir Lepen Jurak	2 September 2019	Season

=== Number of teams by county ===
Position	County	Number	Teams
1	City of Zagreb	6	Dinamo Zagreb II, Dubrava, Hrvatski Dragovoljac, Kustošija, Rudeš and Sesvete
2	Split-Dalmatia	4	Croatia Zmijavci, Dugopolje, Hajduk Split II and Solin
3	Osijek-Baranja	2	BSK and Osijek II
4	Međimurje	1	Međimurje
4	Primorje-Gorski Kotar	1	Orijent 1919
4	Šibenik-Knin	1	Šibenik
4	Vukovar-Srijem	1	Cibalia

== League table ==
Pos	Team	Pld	W	D	L	GF	GA	GD	Pts	Qualification or relegation (Note: Dinamo Zagreb II, Hajduk Split II and Osijek II are ineligible for promotion)
1	Šibenik	19	13	2	4	26	15	+11	41	Promotion to the Croatian First Football League
2	Croatia Zmijavci	19	10	3	6	28	17	+11	33	
3	Orijent 1919	19	9	6	4	26	23	+3	33	Qualification to the promotion play-off
4	Sesvete	19	8	5	6	28	22	+6	29	
5	Rudeš	19	8	5	6	25	20	+5	29	
6	Hajduk Split II	19	7	6	6	29	23	+6	27	
7	Osijek II	19	7	5	7	26	19	+7	26	
8	Dinamo Zagreb II	19	7	5	7	20	21	−1	26	
9	Hrvatski Dragovoljac	19	7	5	7	21	26	−5	26	
10	Dugopolje	19	7	4	8	30	31	−1	25	
11	Međimurje	19	6	5	8	26	26	0	23	
12	Dubrava	19	6	5	8	21	24	−3	23	
13	Kustošija	19	6	5	8	19	27	−8	23	
14	BSK Bijelo Brdo	19	6	4	9	18	23	−5	22	Qualification to the relegation play-offs
15	Solin	19	5	4	10	22	27	−5	19	Relegation to the Croatian Third Football League
16	Cibalia	19	2	7	10	13	34	−21	13	Relegation to the Croatian Third Football League

Updated to match(es) played on 8 March 2020. Source: Druga-HNL.com
Rules for classification: 1) Points; 2) Head-to-head points; 3) Head-to-head goal difference; 4) Head-to-head goals scored (at home if two teams tied); 5) Goal difference; 6) Goals scored; 7) Play-off
(Note: Criteria 2-4 and 7 is only used if deciding champion, teams for promotion or relegation and in that case criteria 6 will not be used).

== Results ==
Home \ Away	BSK	CIB	CRO	DIN	DUB	DUG	HAJ	HRV	KUS	MEĐ	ORI	OSI	RUD	SES	SOL	ŠIB
BSK Bijelo Brdo	—	1–1	1–1			1–0		2–0		3–1	3–0	0–1	0–2	1–2		0–1
Cibalia		—			3–1	0–3	0–4	1–1			1–2	0–2	2–1	0–0	1–1	
Croatia Zmijavci		4–0	—	1–0	2–0	3–0	0–1	4–1				0–1	1–0		2–1	2–0
Dinamo Zagreb II	2–1	2–0		—	1–1		1–0	1–0	1–0		2–2	1–1	2–2	1–2	3–0	
Dubrava	0–0	2–1	1–0		—	2–2	1–1	0–4	1–2	1–2				0–2	3–1	
Dugopolje		0–0	0–2	3–0	3–0	—	2–2	2–1	2–2			1–4				0–2
Hajduk Split II	0–0		2–4		1–2		—		4–0	0–3	2–0		2–2	3–1		1–0
Hrvatski Dragovoljac	3–0			1–0	0–4		1–0	—	1–1	2–2		2–1		3–2	1–0	
Kustošija	0–3	3–0	1–0			2–3	1–1		—	0–0	1–2	2–2	0–2	1–0		
Međimurje		3–0	0–0	2–1		4–2		1–2		—	1–1		0–1	1–2	1–1	1–2
Orijent 1919	1–2		1–1	2–2		3–2		0–0		0–2	—		2–0		3–2	1–0
Osijek II	6–0			0–1	0–1		0–0		2–0	2–1	1–3	—		1–1		1–1
Rudeš	1–0		3–0	0–0		2–1		1–1	1–2			1–0	—		1–0	0–1
Sesvete		1–1	4–1	3–0		0–1				3–1	0–0		3–2	—	1–1	0–1
Solin	1–0	2–2			0–2		2–3	2–1	0–1	3–0		2–0		3–1	—	
Šibenik		1–0		2–1	1–0		3–2	2–0	2–0		1–2	2–1	3–3		1–0	—

Updated to match(es) played on 8 March 2020. Source: Druga HNL (in Croatian)
Legend: Blue = home team win; Yellow = draw; Red = away team win.
For upcoming matches, an "a" indicates there is an article about the rivalry between the two participants.

=== Top goalscorers ===
As of 9 March 2020

Rank	Player	Club	Goals
1	(Croatia) Mijo Šabić	Croatia Zmijavci	12
2	(Australia) Deni Jurić	Rudeš	10
2	(Croatia) Marko Dabro	BSK Bijelo Brdo	10
3	(Croatia) Jurica Bajić	Hajduk Split II	8
3	(Bosnia and Herzegovina) Luka Juričić	Šibenik	8
3	(Croatia) Mihovil Geljić	Sesvete	8
3	(Croatia) Dragan Juranović	Dubrava	8
3	(Croatia) Stjepan Šimičić	Međimurje	8
4	(Croatia) Davor Kukec	Šibenik	7
4	(Croatia) Matej Jukić	Dugopolje	7
4	(Croatia) Jakov Blagaić	Hajduk Split II	7
4	(Croatia) Vinko Petković	Hrvatski Dragovoljac	7

== See also ==
- 2019–20 Croatian Football Cup
- 2019–20 Croatian First Football League
