= 2024–25 Third Football League (Croatia) =

Treća NL
- Season: 2024–25
- Dates: 15 August 2024 – 21 June 2025

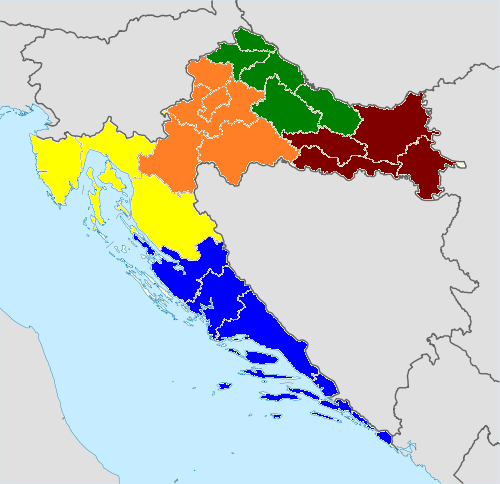

The 2024–25 Croatian Third Football League (also known as Treća Nogometna Liga and 3. NL) is the 34th edition of the fourth tier of Croatian football league and 3rd season of the restructured Treća nogometna liga.

2023–24 season is the second season where the fourth tier competition is named Third Football League, and the second season where the fourth tier competition was the highest competition divided in groups (traditionally it being third tier competition).

The winner of every group will qualify for the promotion qualifications, as well as the 14th placed team in Second Football League. Those six teams will battle for 3 open spots in next seasons' Second Football League.

== Teams ==
The league is contested in 5 groups, based on geographic locations, 16 teams per group. Groups are based on centers: Varaždin (North), Rijeka (West), Zagreb (Center), Osijek (East) and Split (South).

Location of teams of the 2023–24 Treća NL.
Brown: North; Red: West; Yellow: Center;
Green: East; Blue: South.

== League tables ==
=== Sjever (North) ===
Pos	Team	Pld	W	D	L	GF	GA	GD	Pts	Qualification or relegation
1	Varteks	30	22	3	5	72	23	+49	69	Qualification to Promotion play-offs
2	NK Polet	30	19	4	7	80	33	+47	61	
3	Bilogora	30	19	4	7	61	42	+19	61	
4	Pitomača	30	17	5	8	68	34	+34	56	
5	Podravina	30	16	7	7	54	35	+19	55	
6	Rudar Mursko Središće	30	15	6	9	51	38	+13	51	
7	Graničar Đurđevac	30	13	6	11	49	43	+6	45	
8	Graničar Kotoriba	30	13	4	13	51	51	0	43	
9	Dinamo Domašinec	30	12	6	12	40	36	+4	42	
10	Garić	30	10	5	15	33	47	−14	35	
11	Nedelišće	30	9	6	15	39	55	−16	33 (Note: Head-to-head points: Koprivnica 4pts; Nedelišće 1pt.)	
12	Koprivnica	30	9	6	15	40	57	−17	33	
13	Dinamo Predavac	30	10	2	18	49	75	−26	32	
14	Međimurje	30	8	5	17	34	66	−32	29	
15	Slatina	30	5	6	19	30	72	−42	17 (Note: Slatina were deducted four points)	
16	Virovitica	30	4	3	23	33	77	−44	15	Relegation

Updated to match(es) played on 31 May 2025. Source: HNS
Rules for classification: 1) Points, 2) Head-to-head points, 3) Head-to-head goal difference, 4) Goal difference, 5) Matches won, 6) Goals scored

=== Zapad (West) ===
Pos	Team	Pld	W	D	L	GF	GA	GD	Pts	Qualification or relegation
1	Halubjan	20	12	5	3	42	24	+18	41	Qualification to Promotion play-offs
2	Kraljevica	20	11	4	5	41	28	+13	37	
3	Rudar Labin	20	11	3	6	34	27	+7	36 (Note: Head-to-head points: Rudar Labin 4pts; Buje 1pt.)	
4	Buje	20	10	6	4	30	19	+11	36	
5	Pomorac	20	10	4	6	39	28	+11	34	
6	Krk	20	9	5	6	30	20	+10	32	
7	Pazinka	20	9	3	8	29	24	+5	30 (Note: Head-to-head goal difference: Pazinka +1; Vinodol -1.)	
8	Vinodol	20	8	6	6	26	23	+3	30	
9	Nehaj	20	6	10	4	27	22	+5	28	
10	Novalja	20	7	4	9	33	32	+1	25	
11	Banjole	20	7	4	9	30	30	0	25	
12	Crikvenica	20	7	4	9	19	35	−16	25	
13	Naprijed Hreljin	20	5	5	10	15	23	−8	20	
14	Rovinj	20	5	4	11	25	43	−18	19	
15	Medulin 1921	20	4	5	11	19	31	−12	17	
16	Cres	20	2	2	16	17	47	−30	8	Relegation

Updated to match(es) played on 1 April 2025. Source: HNS
Rules for classification: 1) Points, 2) Head-to-head points, 3) Head-to-head goal difference, 4) Goal difference, 5) Matches won, 6) Goals scored

=== Centar (Centre) ===
Pos	Team	Pld	W	D	L	GF	GA	GD	Pts	Qualification or relegation
1	Lučko	21	13	2	6	39	24	+15	41	Qualification to Promotion play-offs
2	Kurilovec	20	12	3	5	24	13	+11	39	
3	Ravnice	20	11	5	4	39	21	+18	38	
4	Trešnjevka	21	11	4	6	29	19	+10	37	
5	Samobor	21	12	1	8	29	24	+5	37	
6	Gaj Mače	21	10	6	5	32	18	+14	36	
7	Zagorec Krapina	20	10	3	7	35	22	+13	33	
8	Tigar Sveta Nedelja	21	9	2	10	34	38	−4	29	
9	Ponikve	20	8	4	8	31	29	+2	28	
10	Dinamo Odranski Obrež	20	7	6	7	22	32	−10	27	
11	Bistra	21	7	3	11	20	27	−7	24	
12	Maksimir	20	7	1	12	26	34	−8	22	
13	Mladost Petrinja	20	5	6	9	22	35	−13	21	
14	Sava Strmec	21	5	4	12	27	39	−12	19	
15	HAŠK 1903	21	5	3	13	15	37	−22	18	
16	Vrapče	20	5	1	14	15	27	−12	16	Relegation

Updated to match(es) played on 9 April 2025. Source: HNS
Rules for classification: 1) Points, 2) Head-to-head points, 3) Head-to-head goal difference, 4) Goal difference, 5) Matches won, 6) Goals scored

=== Istok (East) ===
Pos	Team	Pld	W	D	L	GF	GA	GD	Pts	Qualification or relegation
1	Borac Kneževi Vinogradi	18	9	6	3	28	16	+12	33	Qualification to Promotion play-offs
2	Đakovo Croatia	18	9	5	4	34	21	+13	32	
3	Vinogorac	18	8	7	3	30	21	+9	31	
4	Radnički Dalj	18	7	7	4	23	15	+8	28	
5	Slavonija Požega	18	7	5	6	27	18	+9	26	
6	Tomislav Donji Andrijevci	18	7	5	6	32	25	+7	26	
7	Svačić	18	8	2	8	21	27	−6	26	
8	Belišće	18	7	4	7	31	24	+7	25	
9	Valpovka	18	7	4	7	23	22	+1	25	
10	Čepin	18	7	3	8	19	20	−1	24	
11	Vuteks Sloga	18	6	5	7	22	30	−8	23	
12	Graničar Županja	18	6	4	8	20	30	−10	22	
13	Tomislav Cerna	18	6	2	10	24	33	−9	20	
14	Slavija Pleternica	18	4	7	7	26	35	−9	19	
15	Bedem Ivankovo	18	4	6	8	20	30	−10	18	
16	NAŠK	18	5	2	11	17	30	−13	17	Relegation

Updated to match(es) played on 21 March 2025. Source: HNS
Rules for classification: 1) Points, 2) Head-to-head points, 3) Head-to-head goal difference, 4) Goal difference, 5) Matches won, 6) Goals scored

=== Jug (South) ===
Pos	Team	Pld	W	D	L	GF	GA	GD	Pts	Qualification or relegation
1	Uskok (C)	30	20	4	6	55	22	+33	64	Promotion to the 2.NL
2	Zadar	30	18	7	5	63	30	+33	61	
3	Neretva	30	17	7	6	68	38	+30	58	
4	Zagora	30	17	4	9	73	35	+38	55	
5	Sloga Mravince	30	16	5	9	64	42	+22	53	
6	Vodice	30	14	6	10	49	51	−2	48	
7	Junak Sinj	30	13	6	11	45	43	+2	45	
8	GOŠK Kaštela	30	12	7	11	51	40	+11	43	
9	Neretvanac	30	8	11	11	31	49	−18	35	
10	Hrvatski Vitez	30	9	8	13	35	50	−15	35	
11	Val	30	9	6	15	47	60	−13	33	
12	Omiš	30	8	7	15	33	52	−19	31	
13	GOŠK Dubrovnik	30	6	11	13	22	39	−17	29	
14	Kamen Podbablje	30	8	5	17	41	61	−20	29	
15	Primorac Biograd	30	6	10	14	28	52	−24	28	
16	Zmaj Makarska (R)	30	3	8	19	18	59	−41	17	Relegation

Updated to match(es) played on 31 May 2025. Source: HNS
Rules for classification: 1) Points, 2) Head-to-head points, 3) Head-to-head goal difference, 4) Goal difference, 5) Matches won, 6) Goals scored
(C) Champions; (R) Relegated
