= Ivan Šaranić =

Croatian footballer

Personal information
- Date of birth: 12 May 2003 (age 23)
- Place of birth: Sisak, Croatia
- Height: 1.83 m (6 ft 0 in)
- Positions: Right winger; midfielder

Team information
- Current team: Bursaspor
- Number: 80

Youth career
- –2015: Segesta Sisak
- 2015–2021: Dinamo Zagreb

Senior career*
Years	Team	Apps	(Gls)
2020–2024	Dinamo Zagreb	3	(0)
2021–2022	Dinamo Zagreb II	29	(6)
2022	→ Bravo (loan)	14	(0)
2023	→ Varaždin (loan)	4	(0)
2023–2024	→ Dugopolje (loan)	29	(6)
2024–2025	Al Bataeh	3	(0)
2025–2026	Sesvete	31	(15)
2026	Istra 1961	5	(0)
2026–	Bursaspor	4	(0)

International career
2017	Croatia U14	2	(1)
2017	Croatia U15	5	(1)
2018–2019	Croatia U16	11	(3)
2019–2020	Croatia U17	12	(3)
2021	Croatia U18	1	(1)
2021–2022	Croatia U19	8	(4)
2022	Croatia U20	2	(0)
- * Club domestic league appearances and goals as of 19 October 2026

Ivan Šaranić (born 12 May 2003) is a Croatian footballer who plays for Turkish TFF 1. Lig club Bursaspor as a winger.

== Club career ==
On 16 December 2020, Šaranić made his professional debut for Dinamo Zagreb, coming on as a substitute for Iyayi Atiemwen in the 84th minute in a Croatian Cup match against Rudeš. On 12 May 2021, he debuted in the Croatian First League during a 2–2 draw against Varaždin.

After a stellar season at NK Sesvete, having been named the 2025–26 First Football League (Croatia) best player, he signed with Istra on June 12, 2026.

After spending only 3 months at Istra, he was transferred to TFF 1. Lig side Bursaspor for a reported fee of 0.55 million euros.

== International career ==
Šaranić played internationally for Croatia at all youth levels from under-14 to under-20.
