= Luka Pasariček =

Croatian association football player

Personal information
- Date of birth: 12 March 1998 (age 28)
- Place of birth: Zagreb, Croatia
- Height: 1.69 m (5 ft 6 1/2 in)
- Position: Midfielder

Team information
- Current team: Dubrava
- Number: 27

Youth career
- –2008: Zagorec Krapina
- 2008–2012: Zagreb
- 2012–2016: Dinamo Zagreb
- 2016–2017: Hajduk Split

Senior career*
Years	Team	Apps	(Gls)
2016–2019	Hajduk Split II	58	(4)
2019	→ Rudeš (loan)	12	(0)
2019–2020	Dubrava	9	(0)
2020–2022	Hrvatski Dragovoljac	35	(0)
2022–2025	Rudeš	90	(6)
2025–	Dubrava	19	(2)

International career^{‡}
2012	Croatia U14	2	(0)
2013	Croatia U15	3	(0)
2014	Croatia U16	6	(0)
2013–2015	Croatia U17	11	(1)
2015	Croatia U18	7	(0)
2016–2017	Croatia U19	2	(0)
- * Club domestic league appearances and goals as of 16 June 2026 ‡ National team caps and goals as of 5 August 2023

Luka Pasariček (born 12 March 1998) is a Croatian professional footballer who plays as a midfielder for Prva HNL side Dubrava.
