= Tomislav Gudelj =

Croatian footballer (born 1998)

Personal information
- Date of birth: 1 May 1998 (age 28)
- Place of birth: Zagreb, Croatia
- Height: 1.92 m (6 ft 4 in)
- Position: Forward

Team information
- Current team: Croatia Zmijavci
- Number: 98

Youth career
- –2014: HNK Hajduk Split
- 2014–2016: RNK Split

Senior career*
Years	Team	Apps	(Gls)
2016–2021	Croatia Zmijavci	53	(16)
2022–2023	NK Rudeš	32	(16)
2023	Croatia Zmijavci	12	(8)
2024	NK Varaždin	9	(0)
2024–2025	SBV Vitesse	21	(2)
2025–2026	Croatia Zmijavci	31	(7)
2026-	Floriana	3	(1)

International career^{‡}
2015	Croatia U17	1	(0)
- * Club domestic league appearances and goals as of 13 July 2026 ‡ National team caps and goals as of 6 October 2015

Tomislav Gudelj (born 1 May 1998) is a Croatian professional footballer who plays as a forward for Prva NL club Croatia Zmijavci.

== Career ==
As a youth player Gudelj joined the youth academy of Croatian side HNK Hajduk Split. In 2014, he joined the youth academy of Croatian side RNK Split. Subsequently, he signed for Croatian side NK Croatia Zmijavci in 2016, where he made fifty-three league appearances and scored sixteen goals. Following his stint there, he signed for Croatian side NK Rudeš in 2022, helping the club achieve promotion from the second tier to the top flight. Croatian newspaper 24sata wrote in 2023 that he "transformed into one of the [club's] best [players] since his arrival... a year and a half ago" while playing for them.

During the summer of 2023, he returned to Croatian side NK Croatia Zmijavci, where he made twelve league appearances and scored eight goals before signing for Croatian side NK Varaždin in 2024, where he made nine league appearances and scored zero goals. Six months later, he signed for Dutch side SBV Vitesse.

== Personal life ==
Gudelj was born on 1 May 1998 in Zagreb, Croatia. A native of the aforementioned city, he has been married and has a son.
