= 2025–26 First Football League (Croatia) =

Prva nogometna liga
- Season: 2025–26
- Dates: 16 August 2025 – 30 May 2026
- Champions: Rudeš
- Promoted: Rudeš
- Relegated: Jarun
- Matches: 198
- Goals: 464 (2.34 per match)
- Top goalscorer: Ivan Šaranić (15 goals)
- Biggest home win: NK BSK Bijelo Brdo 4–0 NK Opatija (16 August 2025); NK Rudeš 4–0 NK BSK Bijelo Brdo (10 October 2025); HNK Cibalia 4–0 NK Croatia Zmijavci (30 November 2025)
- Biggest away win: NK Dugopolje 0–4 HNK Orijent (16 August 2025)
- All statistics correct as of 29 July 2026.

The 2025–26 First Football League (also known as Prva nogometna liga and 1. NL) was the 35th season of the second-level football competition for men's association football teams in Croatia, since its establishment in 1992. The league was contested by 12 teams and played in a triple round robin format. This was the fourth season that the second level of men's football in Croatia was named First football league (Prva nogometna liga).

== Teams ==
=== Changes ===
Vukovar 1991 was promoted to the 2025–26 HNL, while Zrinski was relegated to 2025–26 Druga NL.

Newcomers from lower level (2. NL) are champions Hrvace and second-placed Karlovac 1919.

=== Stadia and locations ===
Locations of teams in 2025–26 Prva NL

Team	City	Stadium	Capacity
BSK Bijelo Brdo	Bijelo Brdo	Stadion BSK	1,200
Cibalia	Vinkovci	Stadion Cibalia	9,958
Croatia Zmijavci	Zmijavci	Stadion Marijan Šuto Mrma	2,000
Dubrava	Zagreb	Stadion NŠC Stjepan Spajić	5,000
Dugopolje	Dugopolje	Stadion Hrvatski vitezovi	5,200
Hrvace	Hrvace	Gradski stadion	3,075
Jarun	Zagreb	Ivan Laljak-Ivić Stadium	5,228
Karlovac 1919	Karlovac	Stadion Branko Čavlović-Čavlek	12,000
Opatija	Opatija	Stadion Kantrida	10,600
Orijent	Rijeka	Stadion Krimeja	3,500
Rudeš	Zagreb	Stadion SC Rudeš	2,500
Sesvete	Sesvete	Stadion Sveti Josip radnik	2,000

Rank	Counties of Croatia	Number of teams	Club(s)
1	City of Zagreb	4	Dubrava, Jarun, Rudeš, Sesvete
2	Split-Dalmatia	3	Croatia Zmijavci, Dugopolje, Hrvace
3	Osijek-Baranja	3	BSK Bijelo Brdo, Zrinski Jurjevac
3	Primorje-Gorski Kotar	3	Opatija, Orijent
5	Vukovar-Syrmia	1	Cibalia
5	Karlovac	1	Karlovac 1919

== League table ==
Pos	Team	Pld	W	D	L	GF	GA	GD	Pts	Qualification or relegation
1	Rudeš (C, Q)	33	19	8	6	49	29	+20	65	Promotion to the Croatian Football League
2	Cibalia	33	17	7	9	51	33	+18	58	
3	Sesvete	33	16	9	8	42	28	+14	57	
4	Dugopolje	33	16	6	11	40	38	+2	54	
5	Dubrava	33	13	8	12	39	46	−7	47	
6	BSK Bijelo Brdo	33	11	9	13	30	30	0	42	
7	Karlovac 1919	33	13	3	17	40	45	−5	42	
8	Opatija	33	10	10	13	31	38	−7	40	
9	Orijent	33	9	11	13	40	41	−1	38	
10	Hrvace	33	10	6	17	36	48	−12	36	
11	Croatia Zmijavci	33	9	8	16	32	46	−14	35	
12	Jarun (R)	33	8	9	16	34	42	−8	33	Relegation to the Second Football League

Updated to match(es) played on 30 May 2026. Source: Prva NL
Rules for classification: 1) Points; 2) Head-to-head points; 3) Head-to-head goal difference; 4) Head-to-head goals scored (at home if two teams tied); 5) Goal difference; 6) Goals scored; 7) Play-off
(Note: Criteria 2-4 and 7 is only used if deciding champion, teams for promotion or relegation and in that case criteria 6 will not be used).
(C) Champions; (Q) Qualified for the phase indicated; (R) Relegated

== Results ==
Home \ Away	BSK	CIB	CRO	DUB	DUG	HRV	JAR	KAR	OPA	ORI	RUD	SES
Bijelo Brdo		0–0	1–0	0–0	1–0	1–2	2–0	0–2	4–0	3–0	0–0	2–0
Cibalia	2–0		4–0	0–0	1–0	2–2	3–1	1–2	2–1	0–2	1–1	1–0
Croatia Zmijavci	1–1	0–1		0–1	1–2	2–1	2–2	2–2	0–0	1–0	0–1	0–1
Dubrava	1–0	2–1	0–3		1–0	2–1	1–3	2–0	0–1	2–2	4–3	0–2
Dugopolje	1–0	2–1	2–0	2–1		2–0	3–1	1–0	1–1	0–4	3–1	1–1
Hrvace	1–0	3–2	1–1	0–0	0–1		2–1	1–3	3–0	0–0	0–1	1–2
Jarun	2–2	2–1	4–0	1–1	1–1	1–0		3–1	2–0	1–2	0–0	0–1
Karlovac 1919	1–0	0–1	4–1	1–0	1–0	3–0	2–0		1–1	0–3	4–1	0–1
Opatija	0–3	0–1	2–1	1–2	0–1	0–0	1–1	2–1		1–1	0–1	2–1
Orijent	1–1	2–3	0–1	1–1	1–1	4–1	1–0	1–1	0–1		1–1	1–1
Rudeš	4–0	1–0	0–3	1–0	1–0	1–0	1–1	2–1	2–0	3–1		0–0
Sesvete	1–1	0–0	1–1	2–0	3–0	2–2	1–0	3–0	0–0	1–0	0–1	

Source: Prva NL (in Croatian)
Legend: Blue = home team win; Yellow = draw; Red = away team win.

Home \ Away	BSK	CIB	CRO	DUB	DUG	HRV	JAR	KAR	OPA	ORI	RUD	SES
Bijelo Brdo		—	0–1	—	—	1–0	1–0	—	0–0	1–1	—	—
Cibalia	2–0		4–0	—	—	—	—	2–1	2–0	3–2	—	2–0
Croatia Zmijavci	—	—		—	1–1	3–0	1–2	2–0	—	—	0–2	—
Dubrava	1–2	2–2	2–1		—	—	—	—	3–2	1–0	—	1–3
Dugopolje	1–2	2–1	—	4–3		3–0	0–0	—	—	—	0–3	—
Hrvace	—	2–1	—	1–2	—		—	—	0–2	4–0	—	4–2
Jarun	—	1–1	—	0–2	—	1–2		—	—	2–0	—	0–2
Karlovac 1919	1–0	—	—	5–0	0–3	0–1	2–1		—	—	0–3	—
Opatija	—	—	3–1	—	3–0	—	2–0	3–1		—	1–1	—
Orijent	—	—	0–1	—	3–0	—	—	1–0	1–1		3–2	—
Rudeš	2–0	2–3	—	1–1	—	2–1	1–0	—	—	—		3–1
Sesvete	2–1	—	1–1	—	1–2	—	—	3–0	1–0	2–1	—	

Source: Prva NL (in Croatian)
Legend: Blue = home team win; Yellow = draw; Red = away team win.

== Statistics ==
=== Top scorers ===
As of 30 May 2026

Rank	Player	Club	Goals
1	(Croatia) Ivan Šaranić	NK Sesvete	15
2	(Croatia) Ante Matić	NK Dubrava	14
3	(Croatia) Gabrijel Boban	HNK Cibalia	13
3	(Croatia) Marko Žuljević	NK Karlovac 1919	13
3	(Croatia) Krešimir Luetić	NK Jarun Zagreb	13
