= 2024–25 Second Football League (Croatia) =

Druga NL
- Season: 2024–25
- Dates: 23 August 2024 – 16 June 2025

The 2024–25 Croatian Second Football League (also known as Druga Nogometna Liga and 2. NL) is the 34th edition of the third tier of the Croatian football league and third season of the restructured Druga nogometna liga.

The league was contested by 16 teams and played in a double round robin format.

== Teams ==
=== Stadia and locations ===
Locations of teams in 2022–23 Druga NL

Team	City	Stadium	Capacity
Bjelovar	Bjelovar	Gradski stadion	4,000
Dragovoljac	Novi Zagreb	Stadion NŠC Stjepan Spajić	5,000
Dugo Selo	Dugo Selo	Gradski stadion	2,000
Grobničan	Čavle	Stadion Adelija Haramija Beba	3,000
Hrvace	Hrvace	Gradski stadion	3,075
Jadran Luka Ploče	Ploče	Stadion NK Jadran	2,000
Jadran Poreč	Poreč	Stadion Veli Jože	5,000
Karlovac 1919	Karlovac	Stadion Branko Čavlović-Čavlek	12,000
Kustošija	Zagreb	Stadion Kustošija	2,550
Marsonia 1909	Slavonski Brod	Gradski stadion uz Savu	6,000
Mladost Ždralovi	Ždralovi	Stadion NK Mladost	1,500
Radnik Križevci	Križevci	Križevci City Stadium	1,500
Segesta	Sisak	Gradski stadion	8,000
Solin	Solin	Stadion pokraj Jadra	3,500
Trnje	Zagreb	Stadion ŠC Rudeš	2,000
Uljanik Pula	Pula	Stadion Veruda	4,000

== League table ==
Pos	Team	Pld	W	D	L	GF	GA	GD	Pts	Qualification or relegation
1	Hrvace (C, P)	30	20	4	6	71	41	+30	64	Promotion to the First Football League
2	Karlovac 1919 (P)	30	19	5	6	50	20	+30	62	Promotion to the First Football League
3	Jadran Luka Ploče	30	16	7	7	62	38	+24	55	
4	Mladost Ždralovi	30	16	7	7	55	32	+23	55	
5	Solin	30	17	3	10	54	33	+21	54	
6	Bjelovar	30	16	6	8	56	37	+19	54	
7	Radnik Križevci	30	14	6	10	49	37	+12	48	
8	Kustošija	30	13	9	8	51	40	+11	48	
9	Uljanik Pula	30	10	6	14	41	45	−4	36	
10	Trnje	30	9	8	13	40	53	−13	35	
11	Segesta	30	10	4	16	50	69	−19	34	
12	Dragovoljac	30	9	5	16	36	45	−9	32	
13	Marsonia 1909 (R)	30	10	1	19	40	75	−35	31	Relegation to the Third Football League
14	Dugo Selo	30	8	6	16	45	60	−15	30	
15	Grobničan	30	8	4	18	33	59	−26	28	
16	Jadran Poreč (R)	30	3	3	24	25	74	−49	12	Relegation to the Third Football League

Source: Druga-NL.com
Rules for classification: 1) Points; 2) Head-to-head points; 3) Head-to-head goal difference; 4) Head-to-head goals scored (at home if two teams tied); 5) Goal difference; 6) Goals scored; 7) Play-off
(Note: Criteria 2-4 and 7 is only used if deciding champion, teams for promotion or relegation and in that case criteria 6 will not be used).
(C) Champions; (P) Promoted; (R) Relegated

== Results ==
Home \ Away	BJE	DRA	DUG	GRO	HRV	JLP	JAP	KAR	KUS	MAR	MLA	RAD	SEG	SOL	TRN	ULJ
Bjelovar	—			1–1	3–2			0–1					2–0			0–0
Dragovoljac	1–1	—	2–2	0–1		0–0									0–1	
Dugo Selo	2–5		—									2–1		4–0	2–2	
Grobničan				—					1–2	2–3	0–2	3–1				
Hrvace		3–0			—		3–2	0–3		4–0						
Jadran Luka Ploče	2–3			2–1		—									4–0	4–0
Jadran Poreč			2–5				—		4–4		1–2	0–0				
Karlovac 1919		1–0	3–0			1–0		—			2–3					
Kustošija									—			1–3				
Marsonia 1909			0–3						1–2	—	0–2	2–1				
Mladost Ždralovi									1–1	2–0	—	2–1		0–1	3–1	
Radnik Križevci									1–0			—	6–1	2–0		
Segesta						4–0		4–2		4–2			—			
Solin					1–0				3–0	2–1			0–1	—		
Trnje					0–0				1–1				2–2		—	3–2
Uljanik Pula		1–2		2–1	4–0		2–0	1–2								—

Updated to match(es) played on 21 March 2025. Source: Druga NL (in Croatian)
Legend: Blue = home team win; Yellow = draw; Red = away team win.
For upcoming matches, an "a" indicates there is an article about the rivalry between the two participants.
