= NK Hrvace =

Croatian football club

- Full name: Nogometni klub Hrvace
- Founded: 2000
- Ground: Gradski stadion Hrvace
- Capacity: 2,000
- Chairman: Stipe Doljanin
- Manager: Grgica Kovač
- League: Prva NL (II)
- 2025–26: 10th of 12
Home colours	Away colours

NK Hrvace is a Croatian professional football club based in the town of Hrvace. They currently compete in Prva NL.

== Honours ==
(Croatia) Treća HNL – South:

- Winners (1): 2007–08

(Croatia) Druga NL

- Winners (1): 2024–25

== Current squad ==
As of 20 February 2026

Note: Flags indicate national team as defined under FIFA eligibility rules; some limited exceptions apply. Players may hold more than one non-FIFA nationality.

No.	Pos.	Nation	Player
1	GK	CRO	Jozo Vukman
2	DF	CAN	Daniel Ropar
3	DF	CRO	Luka Basić
4	DF	KOS	Leon Zeqiraj
5	MF	CRO	Josip Mijić
6	MF	CRO	Ivan Gilić-Kuko
7	FW	CRO	Josip Vučković
8	MF	BIH	Vito Medić
9	FW	GER	Dailon Ramadani
10	MF	CRO	Pjero Škarić
11	FW	CRO	Marin Carev
12	GK	CRO	Ivan Šiško

No.	Pos.	Nation	Player
14	DF	CRO	Jakov Karabatić
15	MF	CRO	Roko Žilić
16	MF	ENG	Jaden Jones
17	FW	CRO	Boško Jemo
18	MF	CRO	Daniel Akmadzić
19	MF	CRO	Dominik Ravlić
20	MF	CRO	Antonio Klarić-Kukuz
21	DF	CRO	Ivan Curković
22	MF	CRO	Ivan Ikić
-	GK	CRO	Marin Biočić
-	MF	CRO	Paul Vranjičić (on loan from NK Rudeš)
-	FW	SUI	Leo Perić
