= NK Jadran Luka Ploče =

Croatian football club

Jadran Luka Ploče
- Full name: Nogometni Klub Jadran Luka Ploče
- Nickname: Jadranaši
- Founded: 1959
- Ground: NK Jadran
- Capacity: 1,000
- Head coach: Mišo Krstičević
- League: Prva NL
- 2025–26: Druga NL, 3rd (promoted)
Home colours	Away colours

Nogometni Klub Jadran Luka Ploče (English: Football Club Jadran Luka Ploče) is a Croatian professional football club based in town of Ploče currently playing in the Prva NL, the second division of Croatian football. Jadran Ploče played in the Croatian second division in the early 1990s.

Jadran qualified for the second round of the 2018 Croatian Cup, where they lost to NK Vinogradar 4–2.

== Players ==
=== Current squad ===
As of 4 February 2023

Note: Flags indicate national team as defined under FIFA eligibility rules; some limited exceptions apply. Players may hold more than one non-FIFA nationality.

No.	Pos.	Nation	Player
1	GK	CRO	Antonijo Katić
2	DF	CRO	Duje Manenica
3	DF	CRO	Ivan Dulaj
4	DF	BIH	David Martić
5	DF	BIH	Nikola Rodin
6		CRO	Antonio Radonić
7	DF	BIH	Ivan Raič
8	MF	CRO	Ivano Čepo
10		CRO	Mirko Marić
11		CRO	Antonio Raguž
12	GK	CRO	Leo Margan
13	MF	BIH	David Martić

No.	Pos.	Nation	Player
14	MF	BIH	Ivan Paponja
15	MF	CRO	Antonio Jakir
16		CRO	Filip Musa
17	DF	BIH	Anđelo Kordić
18	FW	CRO	Leonardo Petrović
19	DF	CRO	Stipe Nikolac
21		CRO	Duje Žderić
22		CRO	Ante Glavina
23		CRO	Lovre Tomašević
23	FW	CRO	Marin Romić
23		CRO	Ivan Herceg

=== Notable players ===
The players listed have all played for Jadran Ploče and received at least one international cap.

- (Bosnia and Herzegovina) Dragan Blatnjak
- (Croatia) Mišo Krstičević
- (Croatia) Hrvoje Vejić
