= NK Jarun Zagreb =

Croatian football club

- Short name: Jarun
- Founded: 1921
- Ground: Jarkas
- Capacity: 300
- Chairman: Grgo Jolić
- Manager: Roy Ferenčina
- League: Second League (III)
- 2025–26: First League, 12th (relegated)
Home colours	Away colours

NK Jarun Zagreb are a football team from Jarun neighborhood of Zagreb, Croatia, currently playing in the Druga NL, the Croatian third division. They play their home games at the Jarkas pitch on Ogulinska Street.

== Overview ==
Jarun was a neighborhood club for many years but achieved a double promotion to begin playing in the third division for the 2018–19 season. Many of the club's players graduated from the Jarun football school.

The HDZ, one of Croatia's major political parties, was founded at the club's sporting grounds in 1989, with Franjo Tuđman elected party president.

== Current squad ==
As of 23 June 2026

Note: Flags indicate national team as defined under FIFA eligibility rules; some limited exceptions apply. Players may hold more than one non-FIFA nationality.

No.	Pos.	Nation	Player
1	GK	CRO	Ivan Bosančić
2	DF	CRO	Tomislav Grdenić
4	DF	CRO	Filip Šoštar
5	DF	CRO	Borna Orlć (on loan from Dinamo Zagreb)
6	MF	CIV	Abdoulaye Djiré
9	FW	BIH	Gojko Jelić (on loan from Lokomotiva)
10	MF	CRO	Krešimir Luetić
11	FW	CRO	Fran Čuljak
13	MF	CRO	David Ivankić
14	DF	CRO	Mihael Bužić
15	MF	AUS	Ivan Robert Damjanović
17	FW	CRO	Roko Peroš (on loan from Rudeš)
18	DF	CRO	Vilim Krušlin (on loan from Rudeš)

No.	Pos.	Nation	Player
19	MF	CRO	Patrik Jug (on loan from Gorica)
20	FW	CRO	Nick Ocvirek
21	MF	CRO	Tin Miljak (on loan from Dinamo Zagreb)
22	DF	CRO	Mario Maloča
23	DF	CRO	Juraj Ljubić (on loan from Lokomotiva)
24	FW	CRO	Vito Matijević
25	DF	CRO	Denis Hodak
26	FW	CRO	Fran Petković
27	DF	CRO	Vanja Vukmanović
30	DF	CRO	Ivan Mamić
72	GK	CRO	Ivan Križanović
77	MF	BIH	Filip Musa
