= NK BSK Bijelo Brdo =

Croatian football club

BSK Bijelo Brdo
- Full name: Nogometni klub BSK Bijelo Brdo
- Founded: 1935; 91 years ago
- Ground: Igralište BSK
- Chairman: Marko Mladenović
- Manager: Denis Krstanović
- League: First League (II)
- 2025–26: 6th
Home colours	Away colours

NK BSK Bijelo Brdo is a Croatian professional football club based in the village of Bijelo Brdo in eastern Slavonia. As of the 2022–23 season they compete in the First Football League.

== History ==
According to RSSSF, the club was re-founded in 2002 playing at the Croatian fifth level.

As winners of the regional Osijek-Baranja County Cup, they entered the preliminary round of the 2010–11 Croatian Cup. After beating NK Mladost Petrinja they progressed through to the first round proper, in which they were knocked out by NK Varaždin. They secured promotion to the Treća HNL East after winning the 4.HNL East group, and then won the 2011–12 Treća HNL East group with an undefeated record over 29 games (one team folded at mid-season.) However they did not obtain a license for the second league and were not promoted.

BSK was finally promoted to the newly expanded second division in 2018. This was their debut season in the second tier.

== Current squad ==
As of 23 February 2026

Note: Flags indicate national team as defined under FIFA eligibility rules; some limited exceptions apply. Players may hold more than one non-FIFA nationality.

No.	Pos.	Nation	Player
1	GK	CRO	Ilija Đilas
2	DF	BIH	Luka Miletić
4	MF	CRO	Mateo Pajić
5	DF	CRO	Krešimir Vrbanac
6	DF	CRO	Luka Ćubel
7	MF	CRO	Domagoj Stranput
8	FW	MNE	Damjan Mugoša
9	MF	BIH	Aleksa Raca
10	MF	CRO	Filip Hrs
11	FW	USA	Samid Akanni
12	GK	CRO	Filip Kovačević
13	DF	CRO	Žarko Dominik Jakovljević

No.	Pos.	Nation	Player
14	MF	CRO	Fran Svraka
17	MF	CRO	Luka Romac
18	DF	CRO	Rino Grubišić
19	FW	HUN	Róbert Rétyi
20	MF	CRO	Fran Peček
22	GK	CRO	Ivan Kovačić (on loan from Dinamo Zagreb)
23	DF	CRO	Ante Bolanča
24	DF	NGA	Chigozie Ihejiofor
26	FW	CRO	Petar Korov
27	DF	CRO	Adam Benić
29	DF	BRA	Guilherme

=== Dual registration ===
Note: Flags indicate national team as defined under FIFA eligibility rules; some limited exceptions apply. Players may hold more than one non-FIFA nationality.

No. / Pos. / Nation / Player	No. / Pos. / Nation / Player

=== Out on loan ===
Note: Flags indicate national team as defined under FIFA eligibility rules; some limited exceptions apply. Players may hold more than one non-FIFA nationality.

No.	Pos.	Nation	Player

== Honours ==
(Croatia) Treća HNL – East:

- Winners (1): 2011–12
