= NK Dubrava =

Association football club in Croatia

- Full name: Nogometni klub Dubrava
- Founded: 1945; 81 years ago
- Ground: SRC Grana Klaka
- Capacity: 1,000
- Chairman: Roko Ivanović
- Manager: Petra Mandić
- League: First League (II)
- 2025–26: 5th
Home colours	Away colours

NK Dubrava, or simply Dubrava, is a Croatian football club based in the Dubrava neighborhood in eastern Zagreb. Formed in 1945, the club spent its entire history in lower leagues. Its biggest success to date was spending a single season in Croatia's top level in the 1993–94 season.

== History ==
The club was founded in 1945 by members of HAŠK, Građanska and Concordija football clubs, playing entirely in the lower leagues and undergoing a series of name changes.

In 1992, NK Dubrava hosted the Albania national football team in what was the only second appearance of a national team in Croatia. The game finished 0–0.

After winning the 1993 second division title, NK Dubrava appeared in the 1993–94 Prva HNL, the top flight of Croat football, but were relegated after finishing 17th of 18 teams. They did manage to defeat Dinamo Zagreb 1–0. The club was led by future Croatia national team coach Ante Čačić until 1993.

In 2013, Dubrava reorganised their board of directors. They are known for their youth programs and host a youth tournament every year.

== Current squad ==
As of 1 March 2026

Note: Flags indicate national team as defined under FIFA eligibility rules; some limited exceptions apply. Players may hold more than one non-FIFA nationality.

No.	Pos.	Nation	Player
1	GK	CRO	Dario Maričević
2	DF	CRO	Josip Palić
3	DF	CRO	Nikola Jakovljević
4	MF	CRO	Marek Novak-Stanko
5	DF	CRO	Tin Ljubanović
6	MF	CRO	Karlo Valjan
7	FW	CRO	Lukas Zahora
8	MF	CRO	Matija Tunjić
9	FW	CRO	Ante Matić
10	MF	CRO	Robert Janjiš
11	FW	CRO	Ivan Miličević
13	MF	CRO	Bruno Putica
14	MF	CRO	Martin Vrdoljak

No.	Pos.	Nation	Player
15	MF	NGR	Shettima Ibrahim
16	DF	CRO	Anton Berišić
18	DF	CRO	Filip Brekalo (on loan from Karlovac)
20	FW	CRO	Filip Jazvić
21	FW	CRO	Borna Pernar
22	DF	CRO	Ivan Dominić
23	DF	FRA	Melvin Rémy
24	FW	CRO	Luka Morić
25	DF	USA	Amet Korça
26	MF	BIH	Stipe Miličević
27	MF	CRO	Luka Pasariček
30	GK	CRO	Josip Cundeković
—	FW	SWE	Filston Mawana
