= Zmijavci =

Municipality in Split-Dalmatia County, Croatia

- Municipality
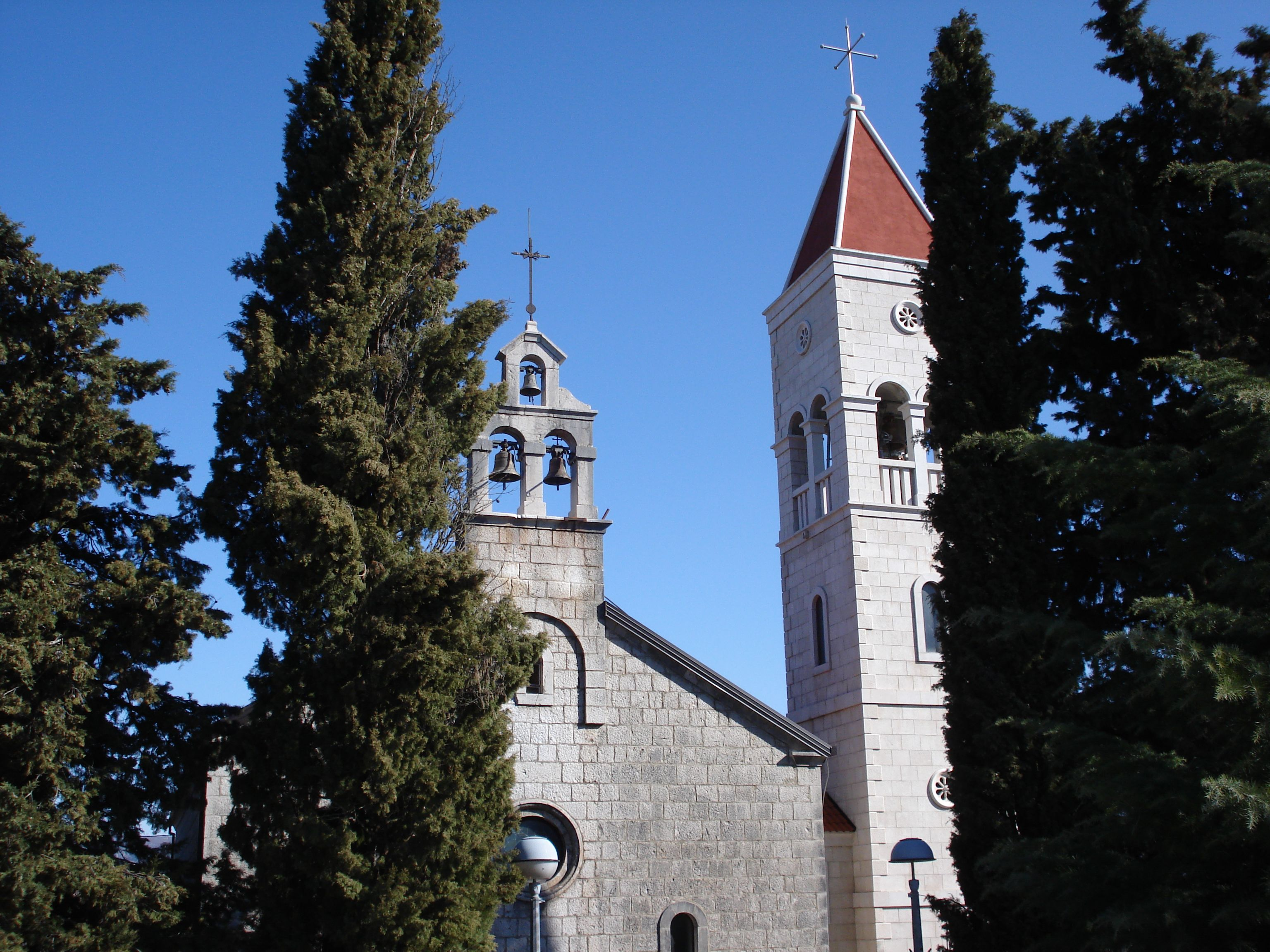

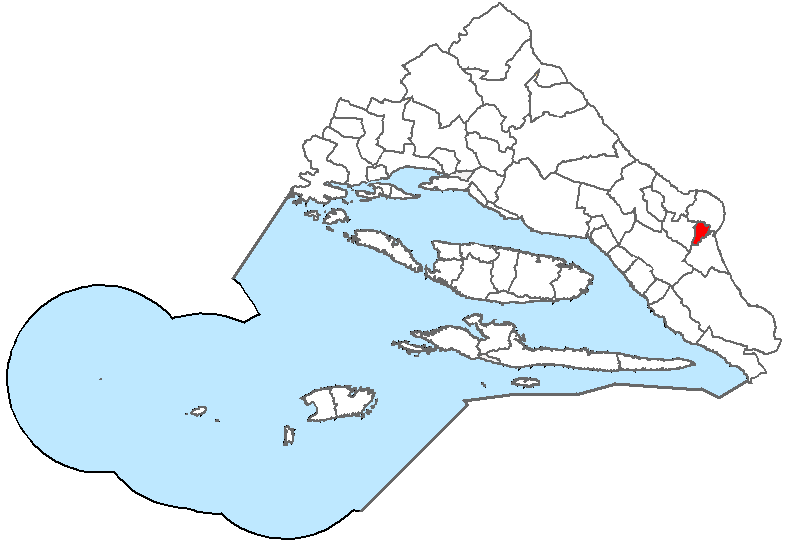
- Interactive map of Zmijavci
- Location within Croatia
- Coordinates: 43°24′39″N 17°12′20″E
- Country: Croatia
- Region: Dalmatian Hinterland
- County: Split-Dalmatia County

Area
  - Total: 13.8 km^{2} (5.3 sq mi)

Population (2021)
  - Total: 1,654
  - Density: 120/km^{2} (310/sq mi)
- Time zone: UTC+1 (CET)
  - Summer (DST): UTC+2 (CEST)

Zmijavci is a municipality in Croatia in the Split-Dalmatia County and the only settlement in the municipality. In 2011, it had a population of 2,048, 98% of which were Croats.

== Demographics ==
Zmijavci: Population trends 1857–2021
v

population	442		585	667	794	816		949	2377	2405	2491	2195	2271	2535	2130	2048	1654
	1857	1869	1880	1890	1900	1910	1921	1931	1948	1953	1961	1971	1981	1991	2001	2011	2021

Sources: Croatian Bureau of Statistics publications

== Sport ==
NK Croatia Zmijavci are the local football club.
