= NK Croatia Zmijavci =

Croatian football club

Croatia Zmijavci
- Full name: Nogometni klub Croatia Zmijavci
- Founded: 23 February 1974; 52 years ago
- Ground: ŠRC Marijan Šuto
- Capacity: 1,200
- Chairman: Mirko Gudelj
- Manager: Ivan Radeljić
- League: Prva NL
- 2025–26: 11th of 12
Home colours	Away colours

Croatia Zmijavci is a professional football club from Zmijavci, Split-Dalmatia County, Croatia, currently playing in the second division Prva NL.

Zmijavci are one of several Dalmatian football teams with a development agreement with Hajduk Split, the largest football club in the area, having signed on in 2016.

== History ==
Zmijavci were founded in 1974, and were known as NK Kujundžuša until 1991.

In the 2017–18 season, Croatia Zmijavci placed in the round of 16 of the Croatian Cup. Zmijavci then won the 2017–18 Treća HNL south division, but refused promotion to the second division. They received a license for the 2019–20 Druga HNL and were promoted after finishing second in the 2018–19 Treća HNL.

== Current squad ==
As of 15 February 2026

Note: Flags indicate national team as defined under FIFA eligibility rules; some limited exceptions apply. Players may hold more than one non-FIFA nationality.

No.	Pos.	Nation	Player
1	GK	CRO	Mario Gudelj
2	DF	CRO	Dominik Pavlek
4	DF	CRO	Tomislav Arković
5	FW	CRO	Kresimir Nazor
6	DF	CRO	Luka Bradarić
7	MF	CRO	Gojko Gadže
8	MF	CRO	Marino Kukoč
9	FW	CRO	Marijan Šuto
10	MF	CRO	Josip Majić
12	GK	CRO	Josip Dizdar
13	DF	CRO	Bruno Brajković
14	MF	MKD	Džemil Jahiji
15	MF	CMR	Joseph Iyendjock
16	MF	CRO	Filip Sabić

No.	Pos.	Nation	Player
17	MF	CRO	Ivan Krolo
19	MF	CRO	Dominik Babić (on loan from Hajduk Split)
20	DF	CRO	David Čondrić
21	FW	CRO	Ante Žužul
22	MF	CRO	Tin Jukić-Peladić
23	DF	CRO	Ivan Krstanović (on loan from Hajduk Split)
24	FW	CRO	Roko Čotić
25	DF	CRO	Niko Radujković
98	FW	CRO	Tomislav Gudelj
—	GK	CRO	Leon Gudelj
—	DF	CRO	Ivan Medvidović
—	MF	CRO	Ante Matić (on loan from Lokomotiva)
—	MF	CRO	Mateo Mendeš

== Honours ==
- Treća HNL South: 2017–18

== Notable managers ==
- Mislav Karoglan (2016)
- Vik Lalić (2020–present)
- Krešimir Režić
