= 2025–26 GNK Dinamo Zagreb season =

GNK Dinamo Zagreb
2025–26 season
- President: Velimir Zajec (until 16 September); Zvonimir Boban (from 16 September)
- Manager: Mario Kovačević
- Stadium: Stadion Maksimir
- HNL: 1st
- Croatian Cup: Winners
- UEFA Europa League: Knockout phase play-offs
- Top goalscorer: League: Dion Drena Beljo (31); All: Dion Drena Beljo (38)
- Biggest win: Karlovac 1919 0–7 Dinamo Zagreb; Dinamo Zagreb 7–0 Osijek
- Biggest defeat: Lille 4–0 Dinamo Zagreb
Home colours	Away colours	Third colours

The 2025–26 season was the 115th season in the history of GNK Dinamo Zagreb, and the club's 34th consecutive season in the First Croatian Football League. Dinamo Zagreb also competed in the Croatian Cup and the UEFA Europa League, having finished second in the league standings last season.

== Squad ==
=== Transfers In ===
Pos.	Player	Transferred from	Fee	Date	Source
MF	(Croatia) Mateo Lisica	(Croatia) Istra 1961		10 June 2025	
MF	(Croatia) Marko Soldo	(Croatia) NK Osijek		12 June 2025	
MF	(Croatia) Robert Mudražija	(Croatia) NK Lokomotiva		12 June 2025	
MF	(Austria) Dejan Ljubičić	(Germany) 1. FC Köln	Free	17 June 2025	
MF	(Croatia) Lovre Kulušić	(Croatia) HNK Šibenik		23 June 2025	
DF	(Croatia) Moris Valinčić	(Croatia) Istra 1961	Undisclosed	24 June 2025	
DF	(Croatia) Borna Graonić	(Croatia) NK Jarun	Loan return	30 June 2025	
GK	(Croatia) Ivan Filipović	(Croatia) HNK Šibenik	Loan return	30 June 2025	
MF	(Croatia) Domagoj Vidović	(Croatia) Rudeš	Loan return	30 June 2025	
MF	(Croatia) Dario Špikić	(Greece) Aris	Loan return	30 June 2025	
DF	(France) Maxime Bernauer	(France) Saint-Étienne	Loan return	30 June 2025	
MF	(Croatia) Marko Bulat	(Belgium) Standard Liège	Loan return	30 June 2025	
DF	(Sweden) Matteo Pérez Vinlöf	(Germany) Bayern Munich II	€2,000,000	1 July 2025	
DF	(Spain) Sergi Domínguez	(Spain) Barcelona Atlètic	€1,200,000	1 July 2025	
MF	(Croatia) Fran Topić	(Bosnia and Herzegovina) Zrinjski Mostar	Undisclosed	1 July 2025	
MF	(Croatia) Gabriel Vidović	(Germany) Bayern Munich	Undisclosed	1 July 2025	
MF	(Spain) Gonzalo Villar	(Spain) Granada	€3,000,000	1 July 2025	
DF	(Croatia) Bruno Goda	(Croatia) Rijeka	Free	2 July 2025	
FW	(Croatia) Dion Beljo	(Germany) FC Augsburg	Undisclosed	16 July 2025	
DF	(Scotland) Scott McKenna	(Spain) Las Palmas	Free	16 July 2025	
FW	(Algeria) Monsef Bakrar	(United States) New York City FC	Undisclosed	1 August 2025	
MF	(Slovenia) Miha Zajc	(Turkey) Fenerbahçe	Free	4 August 2025	
MF	(Algeria) Ismaël Bennacer	(Italy) Milan	Loan	5 September 2025	

=== Transfers Out ===
Pos.	Player	Transferred to	Fee	Date	Source
MF	(Croatia) Petar Sučić	(Italy) Inter Milan	€14,000,000	4 June 2025	
FW	(Croatia) Bruno Petković	(Turkey) Kocaelispor	Contract terminated	11 June 2025	
MF	(Croatia) Marko Pjaca	(Netherlands) FC Twente	Contract terminated	11 June 2025	
FW	(Ivory Coast) Wilfried Kanga	(Belgium) Gent	Undisclosed	22 June 2025	
FW	(Democratic Republic of the Congo) Nathanaël Mbuku	(Germany) FC Augsburg	Loan return	30 June 2025	
DF	(Croatia) Bartol Franjić	(Germany) VfL Wolfsburg	Loan return	30 June 2025	
MF	(Croatia) Marko Rog	(Italy) Cagliari	Loan return	30 June 2025	
MF	(Croatia) Leon Belcar	(Croatia) Varaždin	Loan return	30 June 2025	
DF	(Iran) Sadegh Moharrami	(Iran) Tractor	End of contract	1 July 2025	
DF	(North Macedonia) Stefan Ristovski	(Bosnia and Herzegovina) Sarajevo	End of contract	1 July 2025	
DF	(France) Maxime Bernauer	(France) Saint-Étienne	€1,200,000	1 July 2025	
MF	(Croatia) Martin Baturina	(Italy) Como	€18,000,000	1 July 2025	
MF	(Croatia) Lukas Kačavenda	(Austria) LASK	Loan	2 July 2025	
DF	(Croatia) Niko Šepić	(Croatia) NK Dubrava	Loan	9 July 2025	
MF	(Croatia) Vito Čaić	(Croatia) Vukovar	Loan	9 July 2025	
DF	(Morocco) Samy Mmaee	(Azerbaijan) Qarabağ	Loan	17 July 2025	
DF	(Croatia) Borna Graonić	(Croatia) NK Sesvete	Free	17 July 2025	
MF	(Croatia) Domagoj Vidović	(Bosnia and Herzegovina) Velež Mostar	Undisclosed	19 July 2025	
MF	(Croatia) Marko Brkljaca		Contract terminated	28 July 2025	
MF	(Croatia) Marko Bulat	(Poland) Raków Częstochowa	Undisclosed	1 August 2025	
MF	(Croatia) Dario Špikić	(Portugal) Rio Ave	Undisclosed	15 August 2025	
GK	(Croatia) Nikola Čavlina	(Italy) Como	Loan	29 August 2025	

== Friendlies ==
1 July 2025	Radomlje (Slovenia)	2–2	(Croatia) Dinamo Zagreb

2 July 2025	Bravo (Slovenia)	1–4	(Croatia) Dinamo Zagreb

5 July 2025	Dinamo Zagreb (Croatia)	2–3	(Bosnia and Herzegovina) Široki Brijeg

9 July 2025	Dinamo Zagreb (Croatia)	4–2	(Hungary) Ujpest FC

12 July 2025	Primorje (Slovenia)	1–1	(Croatia) Dinamo Zagreb

19 July 2025	Dinamo Zagreb (Croatia)	5–1	(Ukraine) Kryvbas Kryvyi Rih

== Competitions ==
=== Overall record ===
Competition	First match	Last match	Starting round	Final position	Record							
Competition	First match	Last match	Starting round	Final position	Pld	W	D	L	GF	GA	GD	Win %
HNL	2 August 2025	23 May 2026	Matchday 1	Winners	36	27	5	4	93	28	+65	75.00
Croatian Cup	10 September 2025	13 May 2026	First round	Winners	5	5	0	0	23	3	+20	100.00
UEFA Europa League	24 September 2025	26 February 2026	League phase	Knockout phase play-offs	10	3	2	5	16	22	−6	30.00
Total					51	35	7	9	132	53	+79	68.63

Source: Soccerway

=== Croatian Football League ===
==== League table ====
Pos	Team	Pld	W	D	L	GF	GA	GD	Pts	Qualification or relegation
1	Dinamo Zagreb (C)	36	27	5	4	93	28	+65	86	Qualification to Champions League second qualifying round
2	Hajduk Split	36	20	8	8	61	36	+25	68	Qualification to Europa League first qualifying round (Note: The 2025–26 Croatian Football Cup winners qualified for the Europa League first qualifying round. Since the cup winners (Dinamo Zagreb) qualified based on league position, the Europa League spot was passed to the second-placed team, and the second Conference League spot passed to the fourth-placed team.)
3	Varaždin	36	15	9	12	47	46	+1	54	Qualification to Conference League second qualifying round
4	Rijeka	36	14	11	11	49	36	+13	53	Qualification to Conference League second qualifying round
5	Lokomotiva	36	10	14	12	40	52	−12	44	

Source: SuperSport HNL
Rules for classification: 1) Points; 2) Head-to-head points; 3) Head-to-head goal difference; 4) Head-to-head goals scored (at home if two teams tied); 5) Goal difference; 6) Goals scored; 7) Play-off
(Note: Criteria 2-4 and 7 is only used if deciding champion, teams to international competition or teams for relegation and in that case criteria 6 will not be used).
(C) Champions

==== Results summary ====
Overall								Home						Away					
Pld	W	D	L	GF	GA	GD	Pts	W	D	L	GF	GA	GD	W	D	L	GF	GA	GD
36	27	5	4	93	28	+65	86	14	3	1	49	15	+34	13	2	3	44	13	+31

Source: worldfootball

==== Results by round ====
Round	1	2	3	4	5	6	7	8	9	10	11	12	13	14	15	16	17	18	19	20	21	22	23	24	25	26	27	28	29	30	31	32	33	34	35	36
Ground	A	H	A	H	A	H	A	H	A	H	A	H	A	H	A	H	A	H	A	H	A	H	A	H	A	H	A	H	A	H	A	H	A	H	A	H
Result	W	W	W	W	D	L	W	W	L	W	L	W	L	W	W	D	W	W	W	W	D	W	W	W	W	W	W	W	W	D	W	W	W	W	W	D
Position	1	1	1	1	1	1	1	1	1	1	2	2	2	2	1	1	1	1	1	1	1	1	1	1	1	1	1	1	1	1	1	1	1	1	1	1

Source: worldfootball
A = Away; H = Home; W = Win; D = Draw; L = Loss

==== Matches ====
The league fixture draw was held on 17 June 2025.

2 August 2025 1	Osijek	0–2	Dinamo Zagreb	Osijek
21:00 UTC+2	Babec (yellow card) 38'	Report	McKenna (yellow card) 58'; Kulenović 78'; Stojković 85'	Stadium: Opus Arena; Attendance: 11,502; Referee: Mateo Erceg

8 August 2025 2	Dinamo Zagreb	3–0	Vukovar 1991	Zagreb
21:00 UTC+2	Vidović 45'; Beljo 65'; Kulenović 77'	Report	Simmonds (yellow card) 32'; Pilj (yellow card) 44'; Tadić (red card) 88'	Stadium: Maksimir Stadium; Attendance: 12,721; Referee: Patrik Pavlešić

16 August 2025 3	Rijeka	0–2	Dinamo Zagreb	Rijeka
21:00 UTC+2	Devetak (yellow card) 70'; Radeljić (yellow card) 90+4'	Report	Drena Beljo 24', 31' (pen.); Vidović (yellow card) 56'; Hoxha (yellow card) 69'	Stadium: Stadion Rujevica; Attendance: 7,076; Referee: Patrik Kolarić

23 August 2025 4	Dinamo Zagreb	3–0	Istra 1961	Zagreb
21:00 UTC+2	Drena Beljo 5'; Villar 80'; Kulenović 90'	Report		Stadium: Maksimir Stadium; Attendance: 11,461; Referee: Duje Strukan

30 August 2025 5	Varaždin	2–2	Dinamo Zagreb	Varaždin
21:00 UTC+2	Jovanov (yellow card) 45' (yellow-red card) 90'; Latković 52'; Mamut (yellow card) 71'; Duvnjak (yellow card) 72'; Boršić 80'; Zelenika (yellow card) 90+5'	Report	Lisica 23'; Stojković (yellow card) 25'; Villar (yellow card) 67'; Kulenović 90+2' (pen.)	Stadium: Stadion Varteks; Attendance: 10,477; Referee: Mateo Erceg

14 September 2025 6	Dinamo Zagreb	1–2	Gorica	Zagreb
19:15 UTC+2	Pérez Vinlöf (yellow card) 9'; Kulenović 57'; Varela (yellow card) 59'; Stojković (red card) 62'; Goda (yellow card) 80'	Report	Pozo 21'; Trontelj 47', (yellow card) 76'; Bakić (yellow card) 55'; Peric (yellow card) 73'; Matijaš (yellow card) 81'; Čuić (yellow card) 84'	Stadium: Maksimir Stadium; Attendance: 9,670; Referee: Patrik Pavlešić

20 September 2025 7	Hajduk Split	0–2	Dinamo Zagreb	Split
17:00 UTC+2		Report	Hoxha 44', (yellow card) 83'; Lisica (yellow card) 45+2'; Mišić (yellow card) 58'; Bakrar 80'	Stadium: Poljud Stadium; Attendance: 32,212; Referee: Mateo Erceg

28 September 2025 8	Dinamo Zagreb	4–1	Slaven Belupo	Zagreb
18:15 UTC+2	Hoxha 48'; Kulenović 45+2'; Bakrar 56'; Lisica 71'	Report	Jagušić 66'	Stadium: Maksimir; Attendance: 9,012; Referee: Dario Bel

5 October 2025 9	Lokomotiva	2–1	Dinamo Zagreb	Zagreb
18:45 UTC+2	Stojaković 21'; Pajač 60' (pen.)	Report	Beljo 67'	Stadium: Maksimir; Attendance: 3,354; Referee: Zdenko Lovrić

18 October 2025 10	Dinamo Zagreb	2–1	Osijek	Zagreb
18:00 UTC+2	McKenna 3'; Domínguez 14'	Report	Mikolčić 70'	Stadium: Maksimir; Attendance: 13,836; Referee: Mateo Erceg

27 October 2025 11	Vukovar 1991	1–0	Dinamo Zagreb	Vinkovci
19:00 UTC+1	Puljić 53'	Report		Stadium: Stadion Cibalia; Attendance: 6,679; Referee: Dario Bel

1 November 2025 12	Dinamo Zagreb	2–1	Rijeka	Zagreb
16:00 UTC+1	Bakrar 29'; Hoxha 84'	Report	Ndockyt 58'	Stadium: Maksimir; Attendance: 10,237; Referee: Igor Pajač

9 November 2025 13	Istra 1961	2–1	Dinamo Zagreb	Pula
16:00 UTC+1	Lawal 10', 32'		Bakrar 81'	Stadium: Aldo Drosina; Attendance: 5,241; Referee: Duje Strukan

22 November 2025 14	Dinamo Zagreb	3–1	Varaždin	Zagreb
15:00 UTC+1	Domínguez 31'; Hoxha 37', 53'	Report	Škaričić 87'	Stadium: Maksimir; Attendance: 4,022; Referee: Patrik Pavlešić

1 December 2025 15	Gorica	0–2	Dinamo Zagreb	Velika Gorica
18:00 UTC+1		Report	Bakrar 34'; Soldo 90+2'	Stadium: ŠRC Velika Gorica; Attendance: 3,391; Referee: Mateo Erceg

6 December 2025 16	Dinamo Zagreb	1–1	Hajduk Split	Zagreb
15:00 UTC+1	Hoxha 90+12'	Report	Šego 68'	Stadium: Maksimir; Attendance: 17,028; Referee: Patrik Kolaric

14 December 2025 17	Slaven Belupo	2–5	Dinamo Zagreb	Koprivnica
15:00 UTC+1	Mitrović 2'; Lepinjica 75'	Report	Zajc 6', 45+1'; Bennacer 35'; Beljo 23', 57'	Stadium: Apaš; Attendance: 3,055; Referee: Dario Bel

20 December 2025 18	Dinamo Zagreb	2–0	Lokomotiva	Zagreb
17:45 UTC+1	Topić 11'; Beljo 58'	Report		Stadium: Maksimir; Attendance: 6,270; Referee: Ante Culina

25 January 2026 19	Osijek	0–3	Dinamo Zagreb	Osijek
17:45 CET	Mersinaj (yellow card) 83'	Report	Stojković 30'; Mišić (yellow card) 33'; Zajc 42'; Galešić (yellow card) 54'; Beljo 89'	Stadium: Opus Arena; Attendance: 8,723; Referee: (Croatia) Patrik Kolarić

2 February 2026 20	Dinamo Zagreb	3–1	Vukovar 1991	Zagreb
18:00 CET	Fran Topić (yellow card) 34'; Beljo 42' 84'; Bakrar 68'	Report	Tičinović (yellow card) 30'; Lovro Banovec 74'	Stadium: Stadion Maksimir; Attendance: 4,750; Referee: (Croatia) Duje Strukan

8 February 2026 21	Rijeka	0–0	Dinamo Zagreb	Rijeka
17:45 CET	Sánchez (yellow card) 12'	Report	Zajc (yellow card) 24'	Stadium: Stadion Rujevica; Attendance: 7,102; Referee: (Croatia) Dario Bel

14 February 2026 22	Dinamo Zagreb	4–0	Istra 1961	Zagreb
15:00 CET	McKenna 24'; Domínguez (yellow card) 35'; Beljo 59'; Zajc 73'; Vidović 87'	Report	Miettinen (yellow card) 38'; Prevljak (yellow card) 47'; Frederiksen (yellow card) 72'; Lončar (yellow card) 90+2'	Stadium: Stadion Maksimir; Attendance: 5,600; Referee: (Croatia) Mateo Erceg

22 February 2026 23	Varaždin	0–4	Dinamo Zagreb	Varaždin
15:00 CET	Vuk (yellow card) 17'; Škaričić (yellow card) 21'; Boršić (yellow card) 27'		Zajc 51' 53'; Bakrar 58'; Soldo 88'; Beljo (yellow card) 27'	Stadium: Stadion Varteks; Attendance: 6,987; Referee: (Croatia) Patrik Pavlešić

=== Croatian Cup ===
10 September 2025 Round of 32	Dinamo Predavac	0–6	Dinamo Zagreb	Predavac
16:30 UTC+2			Jelić Balta (yellow card) 22'; Théophile-Catherine 23'; Kulenović 39', 74', (yellow card) 89'; Bakrar 49', 57', 73'; Soldo (red card) 89'	Stadium: Stadion Brana; Attendance: 1,700; Referee: Antonio Škobić

19 November 2025 Round of 16	Karlovac 1919	0–7	Dinamo Zagreb	Karlovac
		Report	Stojković 12', 77'; Beljo 22' (pen.); Lisica 35'; Topić 38'; Kulenović 68'; Varela 88'	Stadium: Čavlek; Attendance: 5,000; Referee: Ante Terzic

4 March 2026 Quarter-finals	Dinamo Zagreb	2–0	Kurilovec	Zagreb
18:00	Bakrar 24'; Horvat 30'			Stadium: Maksimir; Attendance: 4,605; Referee: Ante Terzic

8 April 2026 Semi-finals	Gorica	3–6	Dinamo Zagreb	Velika Gorica
18:30	Bogojević 3'; Sule 24'; Kučiš 89'	Report	Bakrar 6'; Zajc 43', 64'; Beljo 58'; Goda 70'; Fopić 90+3'	Stadium: Gradski stadion Attendance: 3,572; Referee: Duje Strukan

13 May 2026 Final	Dinamo Zagreb	2–0	Rijeka	Osijek
18:00	Stojković 50', 57'	Report		Stadium: Opus Arena; Attendance: 11,055; Referee: Mateo Erceg

=== UEFA Europa League ===
==== League phase ====
Pos	Team	Pld	W	D	L	GF	GA	GD	Pts	Qualification
21	(Scottish Football Association#Table) Celtic	8	3	2	3	13	15	−2	11	Advance to knockout phase play-offs (unseeded)
22	(Bulgarian Football Union#Table) Ludogorets Razgrad	8	3	1	4	12	15	−3	10	Advance to knockout phase play-offs (unseeded)
23	(Croatian Football Federation#Table) Dinamo Zagreb	8	3	1	4	12	16	−4	10	Advance to knockout phase play-offs (unseeded)
24	(Norwegian Football Federation#Table) Brann	8	2	3	3	9	11	−2	9	Advance to knockout phase play-offs (unseeded)
25	(Swiss Football Association#Table) Young Boys	8	3	0	5	10	16	−6	9	

Source: UEFA
Rules for classification: League phase tiebreakers

Round	1	2	3	4	5	6	7	8
Ground	H	A	A	H	A	H	H	A
Result	W	W	D	L	L	L	W	L
Position	2	1	4	12	23	25	20	23

A = Away; H = Home; W = Win; D = Draw; L = Loss

24 September 2025 1	Dinamo Zagreb (Croatia)	3–1	(Turkey) Fenerbahçe	Zagreb
21:00 UTC+2	Beljo 21', 50' Bakrar 90+5'	Report	Szymański 25'	Stadium: Maksimir Stadium; Attendance: 13,926; Referee: Jérôme Brisard (France)

2 October 2025 2	Maccabi Tel Aviv (Israel)	1–3	(Croatia) Dinamo Zagreb	Bačka Topola, Serbia
21:00 UTC+2	Farchi 14'	Report	Lisica 16' Ljubicic 19', 72'	Stadium: TSC Arena; Attendance: 255; Referee: António Nobre (Portugal)

23 October 2025 3	Malmö FF (Sweden)	1–1	(Croatia) Dinamo Zagreb	Stadion, Malmö
21:00 UTC+2	Lewicki 45+1'	Report	Varela 90+6'	Attendance: 14,212; Referee: Willy Delajod (France)

6 November 2025 4	Dinamo Zagreb (Croatia)	0–3	(Spain) Celta Vigo	Stadion Maksimir, Zagreb
18:45		Report	Durán 4', 44'; S. Domínguez 28' (o.g.)	Attendance: 19,431; Referee: Anastasios Papapetrou (Greece)

27 November 2025 5	Lille (France)	4–0	(Croatia) Dinamo Zagreb	Stade Pierre-Mauroy, Villeneuve-d'Ascq
18:45	Correia 21'; Mukau 36'; Igamane 69'; André 86'	Report		Attendance: 22,146; Referee: John Beaton (Scotland)

11 December 2025 6	Dinamo Zagreb (Croatia)	1–3	(Spain) Real Betis	Zagreb
18:45 UTC+1	Goda (yellow card) 73'; Galešić 89'; Ljubičić (yellow card) 90+2'	Report	Domínguez 31' (o.g.); Gómez (yellow card) 32'; Riquelme 34'; Antony 38'; Deossa (yellow card) 55'; Bakambu (yellow card) 90+2'	Stadium: Maksimir Stadium; Attendance: 11,437; Referee: Goga Kikacheishvili (Georgia)

22 January 2026 7	Dinamo Zagreb (Croatia)	4–1	(Romania) FCSB	Zagreb
21:00 UTC+1	Bakrar 7'; Beljo 11', 71'; Kulenović 90+3'	Report	Bîrligea 42'	Stadium: Maksimir Stadium; Attendance: 9,040; Referee: Sander van der Eijk (Netherlands)

29 January 2026 8	Midtjylland (Denmark)	2–0	(Croatia) Dinamo Zagreb	Herning, Denmark
21:00 UTC+1	Şimşir 49'; Bak 74'	Report		Stadium: MCH Arena; Attendance: 8,297; Referee: Elchin Masiyev (Azerbaijan)

==== Knockout phase play-offs ====
19 February 2026 First leg	Dinamo Zagreb (Croatia)	1–3	(Belgium) Genk	Stadion Maksimir, Zagreb
18:45	Beljo 44'	Report	Heynen 15'; El Ouahdi 21', 90'	Attendance: 10,554; Referee: Halil Umut Meler (Turkey)

26 February 2026 Second leg	Genk (Belgium)	3–3 (a.e.t.)	(Croatia) Dinamo Zagreb	Cegeka Arena, Genk
21:00	Sor 51'; Pérez Vinlöf 101' (o.g.); Heymans 114'	Report	Bakrar 45+2'; Stojković 57' (pen.), 75'	Attendance: 11,225; Referee: Felix Zwayer (Germany)
