= 2026–27 GNK Dinamo Zagreb season =

GNK Dinamo Zagreb
2026–27 season
- President: Zvonimir Boban
- Manager: Mario Kovačević (until 1 November); Jerko Leko
- Stadium: Stadion Maksimir
- HNL: 1st
- Croatian Cup: Round of 16
- UEFA Champions League: Play-off round
- UEFA Europa League: League phase
- Top goalscorer: League: Dion Drena Beljo (5); All: Dion Drena Beljo (7)
Home colours	Away colours	Third colours
- All statistics correct as of 26 August 2026.

The 2026–27 season is the 116th season in the history of GNK Dinamo Zagreb, and the club's 35th consecutive season in the First Croatian Football League. Dinamo Zagreb are also competing in the Croatian Cup, the UEFA Champions League and the UEFA Europa League, having won the league last season.

== Transfers ==
=== In ===
Pos.	Player	Transferred to	Fee	Date	Source
DF	(Morocco) Samy Mmaee	(Azerbaijan) Qarabağ	Loan return	30 June 2026	
MF	(Croatia) Mislav Oršić	(Cyprus) Pafos	Free	1 July 2026	
DF	(Bosnia and Herzegovina) Stjepan Radeljić	(Croatia) HNK Rijeka	Free	1 July 2026	
MF	(Spain) Dani Rodríguez	(Spain) Barça Atlètic	Free	2 July 2026	
FW	(Slovenia) Aleks Stojaković	(Croatia) NK Lokomotiva Zagreb	€0.75 million	24 July 2026	
FW	(Bosnia and Herzegovina) Smail Prevljak	(Croatia) NK Istra 1961	€0.8 million	27 July 2026	
FW	(France) Noah Nsoki	(France) PSG	Free	8 August 2026	
MF	(Russia) Kirill Kravtsov	(Russia) PFC Sochi	Free	17 August 2026	
MF	(Uruguay) Lautaro Ultra	(Uruguay) Club Oriental de Football	€0.2 million	26 August 2026	
GK	(Croatia) Dominik Kotarski	(Denmark) F.C. Copenhagen	Loan	31 August 2026	
MID	(Croatia) Luka Ivanušec	(Netherlands) Feyenoord	Free	1 September 2026	
MID	(Spain) Iker Almena	(Saudi Arabia) Al Qadsiah FC	Loan	2 September 2026	

Total expenditure: ▼€1.75 million (excluding potential add-ons, bonuses, undisclosed figures and future transfers)

=== Out ===
Pos.	Player	Transferred to	Fee	Date	Source
MF	(Algeria) Ismaël Bennacer	(Italy) AC Milan	Loan return	30 June 2026	
FW	(Croatia) Sandro Kulenović	(Italy) Torino	€3.0 million (Loan made permanent)	1 July 2026	
DF	(Croatia) Dino Perić	Retiring	End of contract	1 July 2026	
MF	(Spain) Gonzalo Villar	(Spain) Elche	€1.0 million (Loan made permanent)	1 July 2026	
DF	(Croatia) Matija Ruškovački	(Croatia) Sesvete	Free	7 July 2026	
FW	(Colombia) Juan Córdoba	(Colombia) Independiente Medellín	Loan	8 July 2026	
MF	(Croatia) Marko Soldo	(Czech Republic) SK Sigma Olomouc	€2.0 million	11 July 2026	
DF	(Morocco) Samy Mmaee	(Cyprus) Pafos FC	Loan	12 July 2026	
FW	(Portugal) Cardoso Varela	(Portugal) Porto	Free	20 July 2026	
DF	(France) Ronaël Pierre-Gabriel	(Greece) Volos F.C.	Free	27 July 2026	
FW	(Algeria) Monsef Bakrar	(Egypt) Al Ahly SC	€3.0 million	28 July 2026	

Total income: ▲€9.0 million (excluding potential add-ons, bonuses and undisclosed figures)

=== Overall transfer activity ===
Note: All potential add-ons, bonuses, undisclosed figures and future transfers excluded.

Transfer window	Spending	Income	Net expenditure
Summer	▼€1.75 million	▲€9.0 million	▲€7.25 million
Total	▼€1.75 million	▲€9.0 million	▲€7.25 million

== Pre-season and friendlies ==
26 June 2026 Friendly	Radomlje (Slovenia)	0–3	(Croatia) Dinamo Zagreb	Slovenia
18:30		Report	Beljo 14'; Vidović 20'; Kačavenda 71'

2 July 2026 Friendly	Brinje Grosuplje (Slovenia)	0–9	(Croatia) Dinamo Zagreb	Grosuplje, Slovenia
18:30		Report	Vidović 32'; Bakrar 34'; Beljo 45+13' (pen.); Kačavenda 49', 71'; Topić 54', 90+5'; Šunta 74'; Živković 80'	Stadium: Športni park Brinje

8 July 2026 Friendly	Dinamo Zagreb (Croatia)	4–2	(Slovenia) Koper	Zagreb
20:00	Beljo 47'; Stojković 64', 85'; Topić 90+2'	Report	El Manssouri 82'; Adrović 90'	Stadium: Stadion Maksimir

14 July 2026 Friendly	Dinamo Zagreb (Croatia)	0–0	(Ukraine) LNZ Cherkasy	Zagreb
20:00		Report		Stadium: Stadion Maksimir; Attendance: Behind closed door

== Competitions ==
=== League table ===
Pos	Team	Pld	W	D	L	GF	GA	GD	Pts	Qualification or relegation (Note: The 2026–27 Croatian Football Cup winners qualify for the Europa League first qualifying round (or the second-placed team if the Croatian Cup winners finish first). If the Croatian Cup winners finish in the top three, the second Conference League second qualifying round spot will be passed to the fourth-placed team.)
1	Hajduk Split	13	9	2	2	27	11	+16	29	Qualification to Champions League second qualifying round
2	Dinamo Zagreb	12	8	1	3	28	15	+13	25	Qualification to Conference League second qualifying round
3	Osijek	13	6	2	5	22	18	+4	20	Qualification to Conference League second qualifying round
4	Istra 1961	13	5	4	4	24	19	+5	19	
5	Varaždin	13	5	4	4	17	14	+3	19	

Updated to match(es) played on 8 November 2026. Source: SuperSport HNL
Rules for classification: 1) Points; 2) Head-to-head points; 3) Head-to-head goal difference; 4) Head-to-head goals scored (at home if two teams tied); 5) Goal difference; 6) Goals scored; 7) Play-off
(Note: Criteria 2-4 and 7 is only used if deciding champion, teams to international competition or teams for relegation and in that case criteria 6 will not be used).

==== Results summary ====
Overall								Home						Away					
Pld	W	D	L	GF	GA	GD	Pts	W	D	L	GF	GA	GD	W	D	L	GF	GA	GD
6	4	1	1	14	7	+7	13	4	0	0	10	1	+9	0	1	1	4	6	−2

Last updated: 14 September 2026.
Source: worldfootball

==== Matches ====
The league fixture draw was held on June 3, 2026.

31 July 2026 1	Dinamo Zagreb	2–0	Slaven Belupo	Zagreb
20:00 UTC+2	Beljo 34' 53'; Pérez Vinlöf (yellow card) 67'	Report	Kovačić (yellow card) 64'	Stadium: Maksimir; Attendance: 6,311; Referee: Antonio Melnjak

Postponed 2	Rijeka	v	Dinamo Zagreb	Rijeka
				Stadium: Rujevica

14 August 2026 3	Dinamo Zagreb	4–0	Rudeš	Zagreb
20:00 UTC+2	Beljo 6', 61' (pen.); Kačavenda 39'; Hoxha 63'; Dominguez (yellow card) 90+2'	Report	Cabrita Fernandes (yellow card) 53'; Vukić (yellow card) 56'; Šušak (red card) 59'; Seitz (yellow card) 76'	Stadium: Maksimir; Attendance: 5,788; Referee: Filip Dragašević

22 August 2026 4	Dinamo Zagreb	3–1	Varaždin	Zagreb
21:00 UTC+2	Zajc (yellow card) 45'; Beljo 58'; Galešić 68'; Mišić (yellow card) 82'; Mudražija 90+3'	Report	Mladenovski 29'; Tepšić (yellow card) 45+1'; Maglica (yellow card) 72'	Stadium: Maksimir; Attendance: 6,750; Referee: Duje Strukan

29 August 2026 5	Istra	2–2	Dinamo Zagreb	Pula
18:30 UTC+2	Jaganjac 14', (yellow card) 62'; Ahmeti 29'	Report	Beljo 24'; Stojković (yellow card) 13'; Kačavenda (yellow card) 67'; Prevljak 84'; McKenna (yellow card) 90+3'	Stadium: Aldo Drosina; Attendance: 5,021; Referee: Patrik Pavlešić

5 September 2026 6	Dinamo Zagreb	1–0	Gorica	Zagreb
18:00 UTC+2	Beljo 28'; Kravtsov (yellow card) 50'; Vinlöf (yellow card) 64'	Report	Mijić (yellow card) 18'; Stevanović (yellow card) 79'	Stadium: Maksimir; Attendance: 6,612; Referee: Patrik Kolarić

12 September 2026 7	Osijek	4–2	Dinamo	Osijek
17:00 UTC+2	Bukvić (yellow card) 3' (goal) 90+4'; León 12', 35'; Kruiver (yellow card) 23'; Ježić (yellow card) 51'; Vrbančić 60'; Jelenić (yellow card) 78'	Report	Stojković (yellow card) 23'; Zajc 62'; Vinlöf (yellow card) 73'; Topić (yellow card) 79'; Ivanušec 90+3' (pen.)	Stadium: Opus Arena; Attendance: 7,708; Referee: Ante Terzić

=== Attendance ===
	Home	Away	Total
Attendance	25,461	12,729	38,190
Average	6,365	6,365	6,365

=== Croatian Cup ===
9 September 2026 Round of 32	Bedem Ivankovo	0-4	Dinamo Zagreb	Ivankovo
16:30 UTC+2		Report	Prevljak 16', 87'; Ivanušec 21', 60'	Stadium: Stadion Grac; Attendance: 2,813; Referee: Dario Bel

28 October 2026 Round of 16	Vukovar 1991	v	Dinamo Zagreb
16:30 UTC+2

=== UEFA Champions League ===
==== Second qualifying round ====
21 July 2026 First leg	Thun (Switzerland)	1–1	(Croatia) Dinamo Zagreb	Thun, Switzerland
20:00	Labeau 20'	Report	Zajc 86'	Stadium: Stockhorn Arena; Referee: Bulat Sariyev (Kazakhstan)

28 July 2026 Second leg	Dinamo Zagreb (Croatia)	3–2 (a.e.t.) (4–3 agg.)	(Switzerland) Thun	Zagreb, Croatia
20:00	Beljo 74'; Kačavenda 79'; Valinčić 112'	Report	Labeau 20'; Bürki 23'	Stadium: Stadion Maksimir; Attendance: 17,092; Referee: Radoslav Gidzhenov (Bulgaria)

==== Third qualifying round ====
4 August 2026 First leg	Dinamo Zagreb (Croatia)	5–0	(Lithuania) Kauno Žalgiris	Zagreb, Croatia
20:00	Zajc 31'; McKenna 33'; Lisica 51'; Stojković 76'; Kačavenda 90+4'	Report		Stadium: Stadion Maksimir; Attendance: 12,147; Referee: Erik Lambrechts (Belgium)

11 August 2026 Second leg	Kauno Žalgiris (Lithuania)	1–2 (1–7 agg.)	(Croatia) Dinamo Zagreb	Kaunas, Lithuania
19:00	Debuljuh 56'	Report	Kačavenda 19'; Mišić 30'	Stadium: Darius and Girėnas Stadium; Referee: Davide Massa (Italy)

==== Play-off round ====
18 August 2026 First leg	Dinamo Zagreb (Croatia)	2–2	(Norway) Viking	Zagreb, Croatia
21:00	Beljo 6'; Lisica 10'	Report	Christiansen 26'; Tripić 39'	Stadium: Stadion Maksimir; Attendance: 17,342; Referee: Serdar Gözübüyük (Netherlands)

26 August 2026 Second leg	Viking (Norway)	3–1 (5–3 agg.)	(Croatia) Dinamo Zagreb	Stavanger, Norway
21:00	Tripić 18' (pen.); Austbø 48'; Moi 50'		Hoxha 10'	Stadium: Viking Stadion; Attendance: 15,152; Referee: José María Sánchez Martínez (Spain)

=== UEFA Europa League ===
==== League phase ====
Pos	Team	Pld	W	D	L	GF	GA	GD	Pts	Qualification
7	(Germany) Bayer Leverkusen	4	3	0	1	8	1	+7	9	Advance to round of 16 (seeded)
8	(Turkey) Beşiktaş	4	2	1	1	11	8	+3	7	Advance to round of 16 (seeded)
9	(Croatia) Dinamo Zagreb	4	2	1	1	5	4	+1	7	Advance to knockout phase play-offs (seeded)
10	(Bulgaria) Levski Sofia	4	2	1	1	4	3	+1	7	Advance to knockout phase play-offs (seeded)
11	(England) Sunderland	4	2	1	1	4	4	0	7	Advance to knockout phase play-offs (seeded)

Updated to match(es) played on 5 November 2026. Source: UEFA
Rules for classification: League phase tiebreakers

Round	1	2	3	4	5	6	7	8
Ground	A	H	H	A	H	A	A	H
Result	D	W	L					
Position		14						

Updated to match(es) played on 22 October 2026. Source:
A = Away; H = Home; W = Win; D = Draw; L = Loss

16 September 2026 1	Hapoel Be'er Sheva (Israel)	0–0	(Croatia) Dinamo Zagreb	Bucharest
21:00 UTC+2				Stadium: Rapid-Giulești Stadium; Attendance: 1,102; Referee: John Brooks

15 October 2026 2	Dinamo Zagreb (Croatia)	1–0	(Belgium) Anderlecht	Zagreb
21:00 UTC+2	Galešić (yellow card) 30'; Mišić (yellow card) 55'; Beljo 90+6' (pen.)		Degreef (yellow card) 35'; Winkler (yellow card) 73'	Stadium: Stadion Maksimir; Attendance: 12,279; Referee: Orel Grinfeld (Israel)

22 October 2026 3	Dinamo Zagreb (Croatia)	2–4	(Netherlands) NEC	Zagreb
18:45 UTC+2	Beljo (yellow card) 23', (goal) 33', 37'	Report	Bischoff 25', (yellow card) 90+2'; Lebreton (yellow card) 44'; Linssen 45', 54'; Chery 80'	Stadium: Stadion Maksimir; Referee: Manfredas Lukjančukas (Lithuania)

5 November 2026 4	Sunderland (England)	v	(Croatia) Dinamo Zagreb	Sunderland
21:00 UTC+2				Stadium: Stadium of Light

26 November 2026 5	Dinamo Zagreb (Croatia)	v	(Germany) Bayer Leverkusen	Zagreb
18:45 UTC+2				Stadium: Stadion Maksimir

10 December 2026 6	Rennes (France)	v	(Croatia) Dinamo Zagreb	Rennes
18:45 UTC+2				Stadium: Roazhon Park

21 January 2027 7	AZ Alkmaar (Netherlands)	v	(Croatia) Dinamo Zagreb	Alkmaar
21:00 UTC+2				Stadium: AFAS Stadion

28 January 2027 8	Dinamo Zagreb (Croatia)	v	(Austria) Sturm Graz	Zagreb
21:00 UTC+2				Stadium: Stadion Maksimir
