= Fran Topić =

Croatian footballer

Personal information
- Date of birth: 20 March 2004 (age 22)
- Place of birth: Zagreb, Croatia
- Height: 1.88 m (6 ft 2 in)
- Position: Forward

Team information
- Current team: Dinamo Zagreb
- Number: 30

Youth career
- Sesvete
- 2022–2023: Dinamo Zagreb

Senior career*
Years	Team	Apps	(Gls)
2021–2022	Sesvete	3	(0)
2023–	Dinamo Zagreb	32	(2)
2023–2024	→ Rudeš (loan)	19	(2)
2024–2025	→ Zrinjski Mostar (loan)	31	(9)

International career^{‡}
2021	Croatia U18	3	(0)
2022–2023	Croatia U19	6	(0)
2025–	Croatia U21	14	(3)
- * Club domestic league appearances and goals as of 19:14, 18 October 2026 (UTC) ‡ National team caps and goals as of 23:02, 6 October 2026 (UTC)

Fran Topić (born 20 March 2004) is a Croatian professional footballer who plays as a forward for Dinamo Zagreb.

== Club career ==
Born in Zagreb, Croatia, Topić started his youth career with the academy of Sesvete before being signed by coach Igor Bišćan for Dinamo Zagreb at the end of the 2022–2023 season. He played exclusively for the reserves in the season, becoming the top scorer of the youth league by scoring 20 goals. On 8 April 2023, he made his senior debut, coming in as a last minute substitute for Josip Drmić in a 2–1 victory over Lokomotiva Zagreb in the Prva HNL. On 19 June of the same year, he signed a professional contract with the club.

On 28 June 2024, Topić joined Bosnian club Zrinjski Mostar on loan for the season. On 13 June 2025, after nearly two years of absence, he returned to his parent club and signed a multi-year contract.

== International career ==
Topic has been capped by Croatia at under-18, under-19 and under-21 levels.

== Personal life ==
Topić has Bosnian roots; his father hails from the town of Tomislavgrad while his mother is from Posušje.

== Career statistics ==
As of match played 18 October 2026

Appearances and goals by club, season and competition
Club	Season	League			Cup		Europe		Other		Total	
Club	Season	Division	Apps	Goals	Apps	Goals	Apps	Goals	Apps	Goals	Apps	Goals
Sesvete	2022–23	First Football League	3	0	0	0	—		—		3	0
Dinamo Zagreb	2022–23	Croatian Football League	9	0	0	0	0	0	1 (Note: Appearance in Croatian Super Cup)	0	10	0
Dinamo Zagreb	2025–26	Croatian Football League	17	2	2	2	4 (Note: Appearance(s) in UEFA Europa League)	0	—		23	4
Dinamo Zagreb	2026–27	Croatian Football League	6	0	1	0	5 (Note: Appearance(s) in UEFA Champions League)	0	—		12	0
Dinamo Zagreb	Total		32	2	3	2	9	0	1	0	45	4
Rudeš (loan)	2023–24	Croatian Football League	19	2	2	0	—		—		21	2
Zrinjski Mostar (loan)	2024–25	Premier League of Bosnia and Herzegovina	31	9	2	0	4 (Note: Appearance(s) in UEFA Conference League)	0	1 (Note: Appearance in Supercup of Bosnia and Herzegovina)	0	38	9
Career total			85	13	7	2	13	0	2	0	107	15

== Honours ==
Zrinjski Mostar

- Bosnian Premier League: 2024–25

Dinamo Zagreb

- Prva HNL: 2025–26
- Croatian Cup: 2025–26
