= Scott McKenna =

Scottish footballer

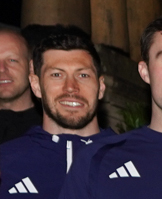
- McKenna with Scotland in 2026

Personal information
- Full name: Scott Fraser McKenna
- Date of birth: 12 November 1996 (age 30)
- Place of birth: Kirriemuir, Angus, Scotland
- Height: 6 ft 2 in (1.89 m)
- Position: Defender

Team information
- Current team: Dinamo Zagreb
- Number: 26

Youth career
- 2008–2014: Aberdeen

Senior career*
Years	Team	Apps	(Gls)
2014–2020	Aberdeen	91	(5)
2015	→ Ayr United (loan)	12	(0)
2016	→ Alloa Athletic (loan)	4	(0)
2016–2017	→ Ayr United (loan)	11	(1)
2020–2024	Nottingham Forest	94	(3)
2024	→ Copenhagen (loan)	13	(0)
2024–2025	Las Palmas	29	(0)
2025–	Dinamo Zagreb	35	(2)

International career^{‡}
2013–2015	Scotland U19	14	(0)
2017	Scotland U21	5	(0)
2018–	Scotland	54	(1)
- * Club domestic league appearances and goals as of 20:03, 18 October 2026 (UTC) ‡ National team caps and goals as of 21:00, 3 October 2026 (UTC)

Scott Fraser McKenna (born 12 November 1996) is a Scottish professional footballer who plays as a centre-back for HNL club Dinamo Zagreb and the Scotland national team.

== Club career ==
=== Aberdeen ===
McKenna began his career in the Aberdeen academy and was initially a left back before moving to the centre. The Daily Record called him "one of the most promising defenders in the country".

McKenna made his professional debut for Aberdeen as a substitute against St Johnstone on 6 February 2016. His first start came against Heart of Midlothian on 16 May 2016. On 22 May 2016, he signed a new two-year contract with Aberdeen, In November 2016, McKenna moved on loan to Scottish Championship side Ayr United for 28 days, his second time on loan with the club. His loan was subsequently extended until the end of the season.

In October 2017, McKenna extended his Aberdeen contract until 2021. The club rejected a bid from Hull City to buy him in January 2018. In January 2018, McKenna scored from more than 35 yards in Aberdeen's 3–1 win against Kilmarnock. He claimed in an interview after the match that Kilmarnock skipper Kris Boyd urged him to "shoot" so he obliged. On 7 March 2018, McKenna signed a new contract extension until 2023.

Aberdeen rejected an offer of £3.5 million for McKenna from Celtic in August 2018. Later in August, Aberdeen rejected a larger offer from Aston Villa. During the summer 2019 transfer window, Aberdeen rejected offers from Queens Park Rangers and Nottingham Forest for McKenna after he handed in a transfer request.

In December 2019 Aberdeen chairman Dave Cormack confirmed the club had received no offers or approaches from other clubs for McKenna or teammate Sam Cosgrove. McKenna suffered a torn hamstring during a Scottish Cup tie at St Mirren on 29 February 2020.

In August 2020 he was one of eight Aberdeen players who received a suspended three-match ban from the Scottish FA after they breached restrictions relating to the COVID-19 pandemic by visiting a bar earlier in the month. Aberdeen entered transfer negotiations with Nottingham Forest regarding McKenna in September 2020, which meant that he was left out of the Aberdeen team for a match with Motherwell.

=== Nottingham Forest ===
On 23 September 2020, McKenna moved to EFL Championship side Nottingham Forest for an undisclosed fee, confirmed by Aberdeen as a "club-record" amount reported to be £3 million that could rise to £6 million. He made his Forest debut on 25 September 2020 in a 1–0 defeat to Huddersfield Town. He scored his first goal for the club in a 2–1 win over Coventry City on 4 November 2020. He was voted as Forest's Player of the Season for the 2021–22 campaign, during which they won promotion to the Premier League. McKenna missed significant parts of the 2022–23 season due to hamstring and collarbone injuries.

On 30 January 2024, McKenna joined Danish Superliga club Copenhagen on loan for the remainder of the season. On 5 June 2024, Forest announced he would be leaving in the summer when his contract expired.

=== Las Palmas ===
On 8 August 2024, McKenna joined Las Palmas on a three-year contract, joining up with his compatriot and international colleague Oli McBurnie. Both were praised for helping to keep Real Madrid quiet in a 0-0 draw at Gran Canaria Stadium.

=== Dinamo Zagreb ===
In June 2025, having triggering a release clause in his Las Palmas contract following their relegation from La Liga, McKenna joined Dinamo Zagreb in Croatia, winning a league and cup double in his first season.

== International career ==
McKenna captained the Scotland under-19s in a 2–2 draw with the Czech Republic in 2014. McKenna made his first appearance for the Scotland under-21s in September 2017.

McKenna was selected for the full national squad in March 2018, and made his full international debut in a 1–0 defeat against Costa Rica on 23 March. In his fourth game for Scotland, a 1–0 defeat to Mexico on 2 June 2018, McKenna was made team captain. On 11 October 2018, McKenna came on a second-half substitute in a 2–1 defeat against Israel, marking his competitive debut for Scotland.

On 7 June 2024, McKenna was named in Scotland's squad for the UEFA Euro 2024 finals in Germany. He appeared in all three of the team's matches at the tournament, coming on as a substitute against both Germany and Switzerland, before starting against Hungary as Scotland finished bottom of Group A with one point from three matches.

On 19 May 2026, McKenna was selected in the 26-man squad for the 2026 FIFA World Cup.

He received his first red card in a Scotland shirt when he was dismissed for serious foul play against North Macedonia in the UEFA Nations League on 3 October 2026. After captain Andy Robertson made a sloppy pass that went straight to Macedonian midfielder Agon Elezi, McKenna tackled him and was sent off by French referee François Letexier.

== Personal life ==
A pupil at Webster's High School in Kirriemuir, McKenna supported Aberdeen FC as a boy. He is distantly related to the late Alan Gilzean, who was a cousin of McKenna's maternal grandmother. His father Ian played semi-professionally in the Scottish Football League for Forfar Athletic and Montrose in the 1990s, then went on to become a director of McKenna group services.

== Career statistics ==
=== Club ===
As of match played 22 October 2026

Appearances and goals by club, season and competition
Club	Season	League			National cup (Note: Includes Scottish Cup, FA Cup, Croatian Cup)		League cup (Note: Includes Scottish League Cup, EFL Cup)		Europe		Other		Total	
Club	Season	Division	Apps	Goals	Apps	Goals	Apps	Goals	Apps	Goals	Apps	Goals	Apps	Goals
Aberdeen	2014–15	Scottish Premiership	0	0	0	0	0	0	0	0	—		0	0
Aberdeen	2015–16	Scottish Premiership	3	0	0	0	0	0	0	0	—		3	0
Aberdeen	2016–17	Scottish Premiership	0	0	0	0	1	0	0	0	—		1	0
Aberdeen	2017–18	Scottish Premiership	30	2	4	0	0	0	0	0	—		34	2
Aberdeen	2018–19	Scottish Premiership	30	2	4	0	3	0	2 (Note: Appearances in UEFA Europa League)	0	—		39	2
Aberdeen	2019–20	Scottish Premiership	24	1	4	0	1	0	6	0	—		35	1
Aberdeen	2020–21	Scottish Premiership	4	0	0	0	0	0	2	0	—		6	0
Aberdeen	Total		91	5	12	0	5	0	10	0	0	0	118	5
Aberdeen U20	2017–18	SPFL Development League	–		–		–		–		1 (Note: Appearance in Scottish Challenge Cup)	0	1	0
Ayr United (loan)	2014–15	Scottish League One	12	0	0	0	0	0	–		0	0	12	0
Alloa Athletic (loan)	2015–16	Scottish Championship	4	0	0	0	0	0	–		0	0	4	0
Ayr United (loan)	2016–17	Scottish Championship	11	1	2	0	0	0	–		1	0	14	1
Nottingham Forest	2020–21	Championship	24	1	1	0	0	0	–		—		25	1
Nottingham Forest	2021–22	Championship	45	2	3	0	0	0	–		3 (Note: Appearances in Championship play-offs)	0	51	2
Nottingham Forest	2022–23	Premier League	20	0	1	0	3	0	–		—		24	0
Nottingham Forest	2023–24	Premier League	5	0	1	0	0	0	–		—		6	0
Nottingham Forest	Total		94	3	6	0	3	0	–		3	0	106	3
Copenhagen (loan)	2023–24	Danish Superliga	13	0	0	0	–		2 (Note: Appearances in UEFA Champions League)	0	–		15	0
Las Palmas	2024–25	La Liga	29	0	2	0	–		–		–		31	0
Dinamo Zagreb	2025–26	Croatian Football League	30	2	2	0	–		10	0	–		42	2
Dinamo Zagreb	2026–27	Croatian Football League	5	0	0	0	—		8 (Note: Six appearances and one goal in UEFA Champions League, two appearances in UEFA Europa League)	1	—		13	1
Dinamo Zagreb	Total		35	2	2	0	—		18	1	—		55	3
Career total			289	11	24	0	8	0	30	1	5	0	356	12

=== International ===
As of match played 3 October 2026

Appearances and goals by national team and year
National team	Year	Apps	Goals
Scotland	2018	8	0
Scotland	2019	6	0
Scotland	2020	4	0
Scotland	2021	6	0
Scotland	2022	5	1
Scotland	2023	4	0
Scotland	2024	8	0
Scotland	2025	7	0
Scotland	2026	6	0
Total		54	1

Scores and results list Scotland's goal tally first.

List of international goals scored by Scott McKenna
No.	Date	Venue	Opponent	Score	Result	Competition
1	8 June 2022	Hampden Park, Glasgow, Scotland	Armenia	2–0	2–0	2022–23 UEFA Nations League B

== Honours ==
Nottingham Forest

- EFL Championship play-offs: 2022

Dinamo Zagreb

- HNL: 2025–26
- Croatian Cup: 2025–26

Individual

- Nottingham Forest Player of the Season: 2021–22

== See also ==
- List of Scotland national football team captains
