= NK Varteks =

NK Varteks may refer to:

- NK Varteks (2011), a Croatian football club, founded by fans in 2011, unassociated with the history and records of the original "Varteks / Varaždin"
- NK Varaždin (1931–2015), a Croatian football club formerly known (1958–2010) as NK Varteks, declared bankruptcy and folded in 2015
- NK Varaždin (2012), a Croatian football club, founded as Varaždin ŠN in 2012, took the discarded name of the unassociated original "Varteks / Varaždin" club that folded in 2015
