= Ismaël Bennacer =

Footballer (born 1997)

Ismaël Bennacer إِسْمَاعِيل بِن نَاصِر
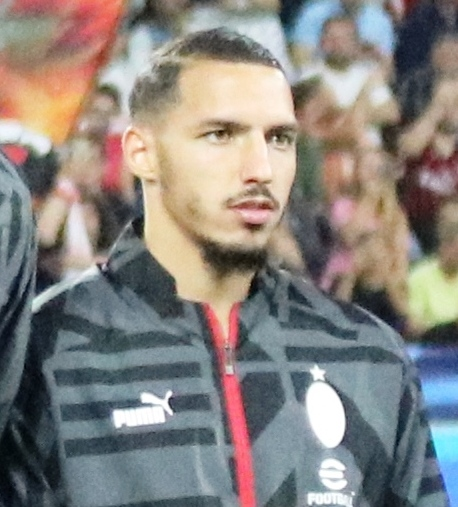
- Bennacer with AC Milan in 2022

Personal information
- Full name: Ismaël Bennacer
- Date of birth: 1 December 1997 (age 28)
- Place of birth: Arles, France
- Height: 1.75 m (5 ft 9 in)
- Position: Defensive midfielder

Team information
- Current team: Al-Gharafa
- Number: 10

Youth career
- 2004–2015: Arles
- 2015–2017: Arsenal

Senior career*
Years	Team	Apps	(Gls)
2014–2015	Arles B	16	(0)
2014–2015	Arles	6	(0)
2015–2017	Arsenal	0	(0)
2016–2017	→ Tours (loan)	16	(1)
2017–2019	Empoli	76	(2)
2019–2026	AC Milan	137	(7)
2025	→ Marseille (loan)	12	(0)
2025–2026	→ Dinamo Zagreb (loan)	18	(1)
2026–	Al-Gharafa	5	(0)

International career^{‡}
2015	France U18	4	(1)
2015–2016	France U19	7	(1)
2016–	Algeria	57	(3)
Medal record
Men's football
Representing Algeria
Africa Cup of Nations
Winner	2019 Egypt
- * Club domestic league appearances and goals as of 23:45, 7 November 2026 (UTC) ‡ National team caps and goals as of 6 January 2026 (UTC)

Ismaël Bennacer (French: [ismaɛl benasɛʁ]; Arabic: إِسْمَاعِيل بِن نَاصِر, romanized: Ismāʿīl bin Nāṣir, pronounced [ʔismaːˈʕiːl bin ˈnaːsˤir]; born 1 December 1997) is a professional footballer who plays as a defensive midfielder for Qatar Stars League club Al-Gharafa. Born in France, he plays for the Algeria national team.

At club level, Bennacer has represented teams in France, England and Italy throughout his career. At international level, he made his senior debut for Algeria in 2016, and won the 2019 Africa Cup of Nations, where he was named Player of the Tournament and assisted the winning goal in the final.

== Club career ==
=== Early career ===
After starting his career with French club Arles, Bennacer signed for Premier League side Arsenal in July 2015. He made his senior Arsenal debut in the League Cup fourth round away to Sheffield Wednesday on 27 October 2015, replacing Theo Walcott after 19 minutes, after the latter had already replaced the injured Alex Oxlade-Chamberlain in an eventual 3–0 loss.

On 31 January 2017, it was announced that Bennacer would join Ligue 2 side Tours on loan for the remainder of the 2016–17 season. He scored his first goal for Tours on 14 April 2017 against Sochaux from a free kick.

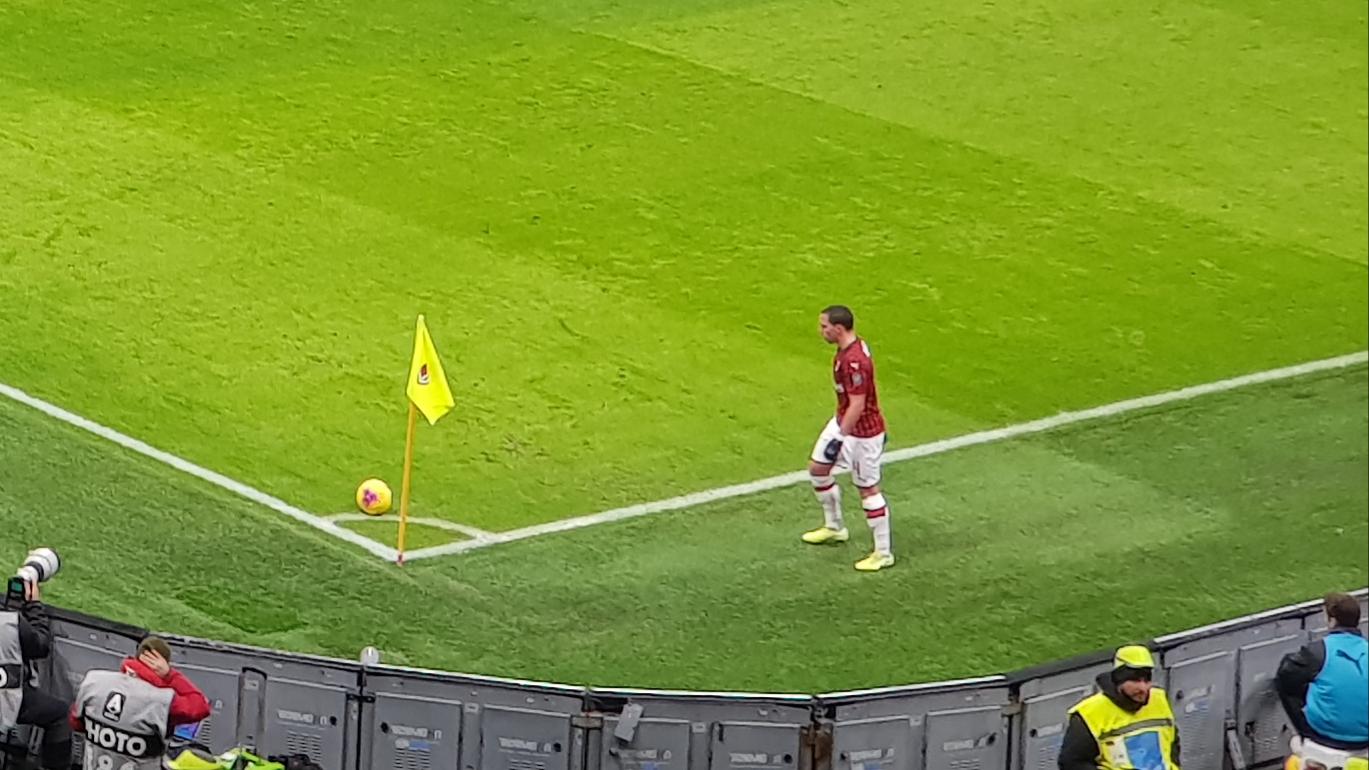
Ismael Bennacer playing for AC Milan in 2020

On 21 August 2017, Bennacer joined Italian club Empoli. In the 2017–18 Serie B season, Bennacer made 39 appearances and scored 2 goals as Empoli won the Serie B title, earning promotion to Serie A. Despite Empoli's relegation the following season, Bennacer's performances confirmed his status as one of the most promising young midfielders in Europe.

=== AC Milan ===
==== 2019–20 season ====
On 4 August 2019, AC Milan announced they had signed Bennacer from Empoli for a reported transfer fee of €16 million plus bonuses. He underwent his medical on 23 July and signed a five-year contract, with a reported salary of €1.5 million per season. He made his club debut on 25 August, coming on as a second–half substitute in a 1–0 away defeat to Udinese in Serie A; his home and full–debut came on 31 August, in a 1–0 victory over Brescia. On 18 July 2020, he scored his first goal for the club and in the Italian top flight in a 5–1 home win over Bologna in Serie A.

==== 2020–21 season ====
Bennacer played 30 matches in all competitions, helping Milan to finish second in league table.

==== 2021–22 season ====
Already a regular on Stefano Pioli's side, Bennacer form generated much praise from Italian pundits, showing dominating performance against the likes of Inter and Napoli.

On 23 October 2021, as Milan was drawing 2–2 against Bologna, Bennacer scored the third goal in an eventual 4–2 win. On 19 March 2022, Bennacer scored a screamer from outside the box against Cagliari, helping his team to win 1–0 and stay on the top of league table. For the first time in a single Serie A season, Bennacer has scored more than once. Bennacer won the league title with AC Milan on 22 May 2022 with a 0–3 win at U.S. Sassuolo Calcio. It was his first trophy with the club.

==== 2022–23 season ====
On 12 January 2023, Bennacer extended his contract until 30 June 2027. Bennacer scored his first goal in the UEFA Champions League on 12 April 2023, scoring the only goal in a 1–0 win over Napoli in the first leg of the quarter finals. In May 2023, Bennacer sustained an injury to his right knee while in training and had a surgery, which forced him to miss the final five games of the season as well as ruled him out of the first half of the upcoming season.

==== 2023–24 season ====
On 2 December 2023, Bennacer made his return to the pitch in a 3–1 home win against Frosinone, coming on as a substitute at the 79th minute of the game.

==== Loan to Marseille ====
On 3 February 2025, Bennacer was loaned to Ligue 1 club Marseille for the remainder of the season with an option to buy.

==== Loan to Dinamo Zagreb ====
On 5 September 2025, he moved to Croatia and joined SuperSport HNL club Dinamo Zagreb, on an initial one-year loan with the option to make the move permanent at the end of the 2025–26 season.

==== Departure ====
On 7 August 2026, Bennacer's contract with Milan was mutually terminated, making him a free agent ahead of the 2026–27 season.

=== Al-Gharafa ===
On 14 September 2026, he signed with Qatar Stars League club Al-Gharafa as a free agent.

== International career ==
Although he had previously represented France at youth level, on 31 July 2016, the Algerian Football Federation announced that Bennacer had opted to switch his international allegiance and represent Algeria internationally. He debuted for the Algeria national team in a 2017 Africa Cup of Nations Qualifier, a 6–0 win over Lesotho. Bennacer was called up on 11 January 2017 to Algeria's squad for the African Cup of Nations of 2017 to replace Saphir Taïder, who suffered an injury in training.

At the 2019 Africa Cup of Nations, Bennacer helped Algeria to their first title in 29 years, finishing the competition as the joint-top assist provider, alongside Franck Kessié, with three assists, including one for Baghdad Bounedjah's match-winning goal against Senegal in the final on 19 July. He was later voted both the "Best Young Player" and the "Best Player" of the tournament.

In December 2023, he was named in Algeria's squad for the 2023 Africa Cup of Nations.

== Style of play ==
Known as a dynamic and versatile left-footed player, Bennacer is capable of playing in several midfield roles, and has been used as a deep-lying playmaker in a holding role in midfield, as an attacking midfielder, or as a central offensive-minded midfielder, known as the mezzala role in Italian football. His main characteristics are his speed, vision, intelligence, composure, dribbling skills, passing, and technique; he is also known for his ability to transition from defence into attack.

== Personal life ==
Bennacer was born in Arles, France, to a Moroccan father and an Algerian mother. Bennacer is a Muslim.

== Career statistics ==
=== Club ===
As of match played 23 May 2026

Appearances and goals by club, season and competition
Club	Season	League			National cup (Note: Includes Coupe de France, Coppa Italia, Croatian Cup)		League cup (Note: Includes EFL Cup)		Continental		Other		Total	
Club	Season	Division	Apps	Goals	Apps	Goals	Apps	Goals	Apps	Goals	Apps	Goals	Apps	Goals
Arles-Avignon II	2013–14	CFA 2	2	0	—		—		—		—		2	0
Arles-Avignon II	2014–15	CFA 2	14	0	—		—		—		—		14	0
Arles-Avignon II	Total		16	0	—		—		—		—		16	0
Arles-Avignon	2014–15	Ligue 2	6	0	1	1	0	0	—		—		7	1
Arsenal	2015–16	Premier League	0	0	0	0	1	0	0	0	—		1	0
Tours (loan)	2016–17	Ligue 2	16	1	0	0	0	0	—		—		16	1
Empoli	2017–18	Serie B	39	2	0	0	—		—		—		39	2
Empoli	2018–19	Serie A	37	0	1	0	—		—		—		38	0
Empoli	Total		76	2	1	0	—		—		—		77	2
Milan	2019–20	Serie A	31	1	4	0	—		—		—		35	1
Milan	2020–21	Serie A	21	0	0	0	—		9 (Note: Appearances in UEFA Europa League)	0	—		30	0
Milan	2021–22	Serie A	31	2	3	0	—		6 (Note: Appearances in UEFA Champions League)	0	—		40	2
Milan	2022–23	Serie A	28	2	1	0	—		10	1	1 (Note: Appearance in Supercoppa Italiana)	0	40	3
Milan	2023–24	Serie A	20	2	0	0	—		5	0	—		25	2
Milan	2024–25	Serie A	6	0	0	0	—		1	0	1	0	8	0
Milan	Total		137	7	8	0	—		31	1	2	0	178	8
Marseille (loan)	2024–25	Ligue 1	12	0	—		—		—		—		12	0
Dinamo Zagreb (loan)	2025–26	HNL	18	1	1	0	—		0	0	—		19	1
Career total			281	11	11	1	1	0	31	1	2	0	326	13

=== International ===
As of match played 6 January 2026

Appearances and goals by national team and year
National team	Year	Apps	Goals
Algeria	2016	1	0
Algeria	2017	3	0
Algeria	2018	3	0
Algeria	2019	15	0
Algeria	2020	3	1
Algeria	2021	7	1
Algeria	2022	12	0
Algeria	2023	2	0
Algeria	2024	4	0
Algeria	2025	5	1
Algeria	2026	1	0
Total		56	3

Scores and results list Algeria's goal tally first, score column indicates score after each Bennacer goal.

List of international goals scored by Ismaël Bennacer
No.	Date	Venue	Opponent	Score	Result	Competition
1	13 October 2020	Cars Jeans Stadion, The Hague, Netherlands	Mexico	1–1	2–2	Friendly
2	12 October 2021	Stade Général Seyni Kountché, Niamey, Niger	Niger	3–0	4–0	2022 FIFA World Cup qualification
3	10 June 2025	Strawberry Arena, Solna, Sweden	Sweden	1–4	3–4	Friendly

== Honours ==
Empoli

- Serie B: 2017–18

AC Milan

- Serie A: 2021–22
- Supercoppa Italiana: 2024–25

Dinamo Zagreb

- HNL: 2025–26
- Croatian Cup: 2025–26

Algeria

- Africa Cup of Nations: 2019

Individual

- Africa Cup of Nations Player of the Tournament: 2019
- Africa Cup of Nations Team of the Tournament: 2019
