= Sergi Domínguez =

Spanish footballer, born 2005

Personal information
- Full name: Sergi Domínguez Viloria
- Date of birth: 1 April 2005 (age 21)
- Place of birth: Barcelona, Spain
- Height: 1.88 m (6 ft 2 in)
- Position: Centre-back

Team information
- Current team: Dinamo Zagreb
- Number: 36

Youth career
- 2017–2020: Sant Gabriel
- 2020–2023: Barcelona

Senior career*
Years	Team	Apps	(Gls)
2023–2025	Barcelona B	39	(1)
2024–2025	Barcelona	3	(0)
2025–	Dinamo Zagreb	36	(2)

International career^{‡}
2020–2021	Spain U15	3	(0)
2021–2022	Spain U17	6	(0)
2023	Spain U18	1	(0)
2023–	Spain U19	5	(0)
- * Club domestic league appearances and goals as of 27 October 2026 ‡ National team caps and goals as of 13:10, 26 March 2024 (UTC)

Sergi Domínguez Viloria (born 1 April 2005) is a Spanish professional footballer who plays as a centre-back for Dinamo Zagreb.

== Club career ==
Born in Barcelona, Catalonia, Domínguez signed for La Masia from Sant Gabriel. After an impressive season with the Juvenil A under Óscar López and Javier Saviola, he was called up to train with the first team for Barcelona with head coach Xavi. Following his recovery from injury during the 2022–23 season, Domínguez made his debut for Barcelona B on 12 February 2023 in a 1–1 draw with Amorebieta.

== Career statistics ==
=== Club ===
As of match played 27 October 2026

Appearances and goals by club, season and competition
Club	Season	League			Copa del Rey		Europe		Other		Total	
Club	Season	Division	Apps	Goals	Apps	Goals	Apps	Goals	Apps	Goals	Apps	Goals
Barcelona B	2022–23	Primera Federación	2	0	—		—		0	0	2	0
Barcelona B	2023–24	Primera Federación	18	0	—		—		2 (Note: Appearances in Primera Federación play-offs)	0	20	0
Barcelona B	2024–25	Primera Federación	19	1	—		—		—		19	1
Barcelona B	Total		39	1	0	0	0	0	2	0	41	1
Barcelona	2024–25	La Liga	3	0	1	0	2 (Note: Appearances in UEFA Champions League)	0	—		6	0
Dinamo Zagreb	2025–26	Croatian Football League	30	2	3	0	8 (Note: Appearances in UEFA Europa League)	0	—		41	2
Dinamo Zagreb	2026–27	Croatian Football League	6	0	1	0	9 (Note: Six appearances in UEFA Champions League, three appearances in UEFA Europa League)	0	—		16	0
Dinamo Zagreb	Total		36	2	4	0	17	0	—		57	2
Career total			78	3	5	0	19	0	2	0	104	3

== Honours ==
Barcelona

- La Liga: 2024–25
- Copa del Rey: 2024–25
- Supercopa de España: 2024–25

Dinamo Zagreb

- HNL: 2025–26
- Croatian Football Cup: 2025–26

Individual

- HNL Team of the Season: 2025–26
