= Romario Matova =

Zimbabwean football player (born 1999)

Personal information
- Date of birth: 10 July 1999 (age 27)
- Place of birth: Harare, Zimbabwe
- Height: 1.72 m (5 ft 8 in)
- Position: Defender

Team information
- Current team: Varteks Varaždin
- Number: 18

Youth career
- 2018–2019: Malatyaspor

Senior career*
| Years | Team | Apps | (Gls) |
| 2020–2021 | Solin | 28 | (1) |
| 2021-2022 | GOŠK Gabela | 18 | (1) |
| 2023- | Varteks Varaždin | | |

International career^{‡}
| 2021– | Zimbabwe | 1 | (0) |
- * Club domestic league appearances and goals as of 21 March 2021 ‡ National team caps and goals as of 29 March 2021

Romario Matova (born 10 July 1999) is a Zimbabwean football player. He plays for Croatian third-tier side Varteks Varaždin.

== Club career ==
Matova joined Bosnian side GOŠK Gabela from Solin in August 2021. In January 2023 he signed for Varteks Varaždin after a spell at Bednja.

== International career ==
He made his debut for Zimbabwe national football team on 29 March 2021 in a 2021 Africa Cup of Nations qualifier against Zambia.
