= Niko Galešić =

Croatian footballer (born 2001)

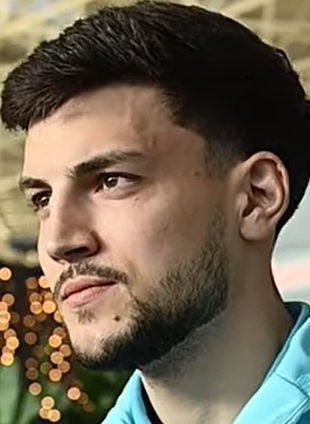

Personal information
- Date of birth: 26 March 2001 (age 25)
- Place of birth: Berlin, Germany
- Height: 1.82 m (6 ft 0 in)
- Position: Defender

Team information
- Current team: Dinamo Zagreb
- Number: 15

Youth career
- 2007–2012: Viktoria 1889 Berlin
- 2012–2019: Hertha BSC
- 2019–2020: Rijeka

Senior career*
Years	Team	Apps	(Gls)
2020–2025	Rijeka	80	(6)
2022	→ Hrvatski Dragovoljac (loan)	15	(2)
2025–	Dinamo Zagreb	40	(3)

International career^{‡}
2020	Croatia U19	5	(1)
2021–2022	Croatia U20	4	(0)
2023	Croatia U21	2	(0)
- * Club domestic league appearances and goals as of 27 October 2026 ‡ National team caps and goals as of 10 January 2025

Niko Galešić (born 26 March 2001) is a Croatian footballer playing as a defender for Dinamo Zagreb.

== Career statistics ==
=== Club ===
As of 27 October 2026

Club	Season	League			Cup		Continental		Other		Total	
Club	Season	Division	Apps	Goals	Apps	Goals	Apps	Goals	Apps	Goals	Apps	Goals
Rijeka	2019–20	1. HNL	1	0	0	0	0	0	0	0	1	0
Rijeka	2020–21	1. HNL	8	0	0	0	0	0	0	0	8	0
Rijeka	2021–22	1. HNL	3	0	0	0	2 (Note: Appearance(s) in UEFA Conference League)	0	0	0	5	0
Rijeka	2022–23	1. HNL	25	0	1	0	0	0	0	0	26	0
Rijeka	2023–24	1. HNL	27	4	4	1	4	0	0	0	35	5
Rijeka	2024–25	1. HNL	16	2	1	0	6 (Note: 4 appearances in UEFA Europa League; 2 appearances in UEFA Conference League)	1	0	0	23	3
Rijeka	Total		80	6	6	1	12	1	0	0	98	8
Hrvatski Dragovoljac	2021-22	1. HNL	15	2	0	0	0	0	0	0	15	2
Dinamo Zagreb	2024–25	Croatian Football League	10	0	1	0	—		—		11	0
Dinamo Zagreb	2025–26	Croatian Football League	21	0	5	0	4 (Note: Appearances in UEFA Europa League)	1	0	0	30	1
Dinamo Zagreb	2026–27	Croatian Football League	9	3	1	0	7 (Note: Four appearances in UEFA Champions League, three appearances in UEFA Europa League)	0	—		17	3
Dinamo Zagreb	Total		40	3	7	0	11	1	0	0	58	4
Career total			135	11	13	1	23	2	0	0	171	14

== Honours ==
=== Rijeka ===
- Croatian Cup: 2020

=== Individual ===
- Croatian Football League Team of the Year: 2023–24
