= 2025–26 Croatian Football League =

SuperSport Hrvatska nogometna liga
- Season: 2025–26
- Dates: 1 August 2025 – 23 May 2026
- Champions: Dinamo Zagreb (26th title)
- Relegated: Vukovar 1991
- Champions League: Dinamo Zagreb
- Europa League: Hajduk Split
- Conference League: Rijeka; Varaždin
- Matches: 180
- Goals: 479 (2.66 per match)
- Top goalscorer: Dion Drena Beljo (31 goals)
- Biggest home win: Dinamo Zagreb 7–0 Osijek (4 April 2026)
- Biggest away win: Vukovar 1991 0–6 Hajduk Split (21 March 2026)
- Highest scoring: Hajduk Split 6–3 Vukovar 1991 (22 May 2026)
- Longest winning run: Dinamo Zagreb (8 matches)
- Longest unbeaten run: Dinamo Zagreb (23 matches)
- Longest winless run: Osijek (11 matches)
- Longest losing run: Istra 1961 (5 matches)
- Total attendance: 945,330
- Average attendance: 5,252

The 2025–26 Croatian Football League (officially SuperSport Hrvatska nogometna liga for sponsorship reasons) was the 35th season of the Croatian top division football, the national championship for men's association football teams in Croatia, since its establishment in 1992. The season started on 1 August 2025.

The league was contested by 10 teams.

== Teams ==
The following teams compete in the 2025–26 HNL.

=== Changes ===
Vukovar 1991 were promoted from the 2024–25 Prva NL for the first time in their history while Šibenik were relegated to the 2025–26 Prva NL after one season back in the top flight.

=== Stadia and locations ===
Dinamo Zagreb	Gorica	Hajduk Split	Istra 1961
Stadion Maksimir	Gradski stadion Velika Gorica	Stadion Poljud	Stadion Aldo Drosina
Capacity: 24,851	Capacity: 8,000	Capacity: 33,987	Capacity: 9,921
Lokomotiva	Locations of teams in 2025–26 HNL		Osijek
Stadion Maksimir	Locations of teams in 2025–26 HNL		Opus Arena
Capacity: 24,851	Locations of teams in 2025–26 HNL		Capacity: 13,005
Rijeka	Slaven Belupo	Varaždin	Vukovar 1991
Stadion Rujevica	Stadion Ivan Kušek-Apaš	Stadion Varteks	Stadion Gradski vrt
Capacity: 8,191	Capacity: 3,054	Capacity: 8,818	Capacity: 18,856

Club	City	Stadium	Capacity	Ref.
Dinamo Zagreb	Zagreb	Maksimir	24,851	
Gorica	Velika Gorica	ŠRC Velika Gorica	4,536	
Hajduk Split	Split	Poljud	33,987	
Istra 1961	Pula	Stadion Aldo Drosina	10,000	
Lokomotiva	Zagreb	Maksimir	24,851	
Osijek	Osijek	Opus Arena	13,005	
Rijeka	Rijeka	Rujevica	8,191	
Slaven Belupo	Koprivnica	Stadion Ivan Kušek-Apaš	3,054	
Varaždin	Varaždin	Stadion Varteks	8,818	
Vukovar 1991	Vukovar	Stadion Gradski vrt	18,856	

Rank	Counties of Croatia	Number of clubs	Club(s)
1	City of Zagreb	2	Dinamo Zagreb, Lokomotiva
2	Istria	1	Istra 1961
2	Koprivnica-Križevci	1	Slaven Belupo
2	Osijek-Baranja	1	Osijek
2	Primorje-Gorski Kotar	1	Rijeka
2	Split-Dalmatia	1	Hajduk Split
2	Varaždin	1	Varaždin
2	Vukovar-Srijem	1	Vukovar 1991
2	Zagreb County	1	Gorica

=== Personnel and kits ===
Club	Manager	Captain	Kit manufacturer	Sponsors
Dinamo Zagreb	(Croatia) Mario Kovačević	(Croatia) Josip Mišić	Castore	PSK
Gorica	(Croatia) Mario Carević	(Croatia) Jurica Pršir	Alpas	Kömmerling
Hajduk Split	(Spain) Gonzalo García	(Croatia) Marko Livaja	Adidas	Tommy
Istra 1961	(Croatia) Krešimir Režić	(Croatia) Josip Radošević	Joma	Germania
Lokomotiva	(Croatia) Nikica Jelavić	(Croatia) Denis Kolinger	Macron	Favbet
Osijek	(Croatia) Tomislav Radotić	(Croatia) Borna Barišić	2Rule	Mészáros és Mészáros Kft.
Rijeka	(Spain) Víctor Sánchez	(Bosnia and Herzegovina) Martin Zlomislić	Joma	Favbet
Slaven Belupo	(Croatia) Mario Gregurina	(Croatia) Tomislav Božić	Jako	Belupo
Varaždin	(Croatia) Nikola Šafarić	(Croatia) Oliver Zelenika	Capelli Sport	BURAI
Vukovar 1991	(Croatia) Tomislav Stipić	(Croatia) Jakov Biljan	Nike	Ellington Properties

=== Managerial changes ===
Team	Outgoing manager	Manner of departure	Date of vacancy	Position in table	Replaced by	Date of appointment
Dinamo Zagreb	(Croatia) Sandro Perković (caretaker)	End of caretaker spell	4 June 2025	Pre-season	(Croatia) Mario Kovačević	4 June 2025
Slaven Belupo	(Croatia) Mario Kovačević	Signed by Dinamo Zagreb	4 June 2025	Pre-season	(Croatia) Mario Gregurina	6 June 2025
Hajduk Split	(Italy) Gennaro Gattuso	Mutual consent	5 June 2025	Pre-season	(Spain) Gonzalo García	13 June 2025
Istra 1961	(Spain) Gonzalo García	Signed by Hajduk Split	13 June 2025	Pre-season	(Croatia) Goran Tomić	13 June 2025
Lokomotiva	(Croatia) Mario Cvitanović	End of contract	17 June 2025	Pre-season	(Croatia) Nikica Jelavić	17 June 2025
Rijeka	(Montenegro) Radomir Đalović	Sacked	1 September 2025	7th	(Spain) Víctor Sánchez	3 September 2025
Istra 1961	(Croatia) Goran Tomić	Sacked	13 September 2025	8th	(Spain) Oriol Riera	17 September 2025
Vukovar 1991	(Croatia) Gordon Schildenfeld	Sacked	18 September 2025	10th	(Croatia) Kristijan Polovanec (caretaker)	18 September 2025
Vukovar 1991	(Croatia) Kristijan Polovanec (caretaker)	End of caretaker spell	22 September 2025	10th	(Croatia) Silvijo Čabraja	22 September 2025
Osijek	(Slovenia) Simon Rožman	Sacked	29 October 2025	9th	(Croatia) Željko Sopić	29 October 2025
Osijek	(Croatia) Željko Sopić	Sacked	23 February 2026	10th	(Croatia) Tomislav Radotić	24 February 2026
Vukovar 1991	(Croatia) Silvijo Čabraja	Sacked	16 March 2026	10th	(Croatia) Tomislav Stipić	18 March 2026
Istra 1961	(Spain) Oriol Riera	Sacked	19 April 2026	7th	(Croatia) Krešimir Režić	20 April 2026

== League table ==
Pos	Team	Pld	W	D	L	GF	GA	GD	Pts	Qualification or relegation
1	Dinamo Zagreb (C)	36	27	5	4	93	28	+65	86	Qualification to Champions League second qualifying round
2	Hajduk Split	36	20	8	8	61	36	+25	68	Qualification to Europa League first qualifying round (Note: The 2025–26 Croatian Football Cup winners qualified for the Europa League first qualifying round. Since the cup winners (Dinamo Zagreb) qualified based on league position, the Europa League spot was passed to the second-placed team, and the second Conference League spot passed to the fourth-placed team.)
3	Varaždin	36	15	9	12	47	46	+1	54	Qualification to Conference League second qualifying round
4	Rijeka	36	14	11	11	49	36	+13	53	Qualification to Conference League second qualifying round
5	Lokomotiva	36	10	14	12	40	52	−12	44	
6	Istra 1961	36	12	7	17	39	50	−11	43	
7	Gorica	36	11	8	17	40	48	−8	41	
8	Slaven Belupo	36	10	11	15	46	61	−15	41	
9	Osijek	36	8	11	17	27	49	−22	35	
10	Vukovar 1991 (R)	36	6	10	20	37	73	−36	28	Relegation to First Football League

Source: SuperSport HNL
Rules for classification: 1) Points; 2) Head-to-head points; 3) Head-to-head goal difference; 4) Head-to-head goals scored (at home if two teams tied); 5) Goal difference; 6) Goals scored; 7) Play-off
(Note: Criteria 2-4 and 7 is only used if deciding champion, teams to international competition or teams for relegation and in that case criteria 6 will not be used).
(C) Champions; (R) Relegated

=== Results ===
Each team plays home-and-away against every other team in the league twice, for a total of 36 matches each played.

Home \ Away	DIN	GOR	HAJ	IST	LOK	OSI	RIJ	SLA	VAR	VUK	DIN	GOR	HAJ	IST	LOK	OSI	RIJ	SLA	VAR	VUK
Dinamo Zagreb		1–2	1–1	3–0	2–0	2–1	2–1	4–1	3–1	3–0		4–2	2–0	4–0	0–0	7–0	2–2	4–2	2–1	3–1
Gorica	0–2		1–3	1–0	4–1	0–1	1–3	2–1	1–3	1–1	1–2		1–0	1–0	0–2	2–0	4–0	2–2	1–2	0–0
Hajduk Split	0–2	2–0		2–1	2–0	2–0	2–2	3–0	1–1	2–1	1–3	1–0		1–2	2–1	0–1	1–0	2–0	3–1	6–3
Istra 1961	2–1	1–0	0–3		2–2	2–1	1–2	1–1	1–0	1–1	0–2	0–2	1–3		1–1	0–1	0–0	3–1	2–1	1–2
Lokomotiva	2–1	1–3	1–3	1–2		1–1	1–1	1–1	1–0	1–0	0–5	3–0	1–1	2–0		3–1	0–3	2–1	1–1	2–1
Osijek	0–2	1–1	0–2	1–5	1–1		0–0	0–0	0–0	4–0	0–3	0–0	0–2	0–1	0–0		1–0	2–0	0–2	2–0
Rijeka	0–2	1–0	5–0	0–0	1–1	4–2		2–0	1–2	3–1	0–0	2–0	0–0	0–2	2–0	0–2		2–2	3–1	3–0
Slaven Belupo	2–5	2–1	0–0	2–1	1–2	2–1	1–1		3–1	4–1	1–4	1–0	2–2	1–0	2–0	0–0	0–2		0–2	2–2
Varaždin	2–2	1–1	2–0	1–3	4–2	0–0	1–0	1–3		2–1	0–4	1–1	1–1	2–0	1–1	2–1	1–0	2–1		2–0
Vukovar 1991	1–0	2–2	0–1	1–1	1–1	2–2	3–2	1–2	2–0		1–4	1–2	0–6	3–2	1–1	1–0	0–1	2–2	0–2	

Source: SuperSport HNL (in Croatian)
Legend: Blue = home team win; Yellow = draw; Red = away team win.

== Statistics ==
=== Top scorers ===
As of 23 May 2026

Rank	Player	Club	Goals
1	(Croatia) Dion Drena Beljo	Dinamo Zagreb	31
2	(Croatia) Jakov Puljić	Vukovar 1991	17
3	(Bosnia and Herzegovina) Smail Prevljak	Istra 1961	14
4	(Croatia) Michele Šego	Hajduk Split	13
5	(Croatia) Toni Fruk	Rijeka	12
6	(Algeria) Monsef Bakrar	Dinamo Zagreb	10
7	(Croatia) Ivan Mamut	Varaždin	9
7	(Croatia) Marko Livaja	Hajduk Split	9
7	(United States) Rokas Pukštas	Hajduk Split	9
7	(Bosnia and Herzegovina) Nail Omerović	Osijek	9
11	(Slovenia) Miha Zajc	Dinamo Zagreb	8
11	(Croatia) Josip Mitrović	Slaven Belupo	8
11	(Montenegro) Aleksa Latković	Varaždin	8
11	(Croatia) Luka Mamić	Varaždin	8
11	(Slovenia) Aleks Stojaković	Lokomotiva Zagreb	8

== Annual awards ==
=== Official awards ===
Given by HNS, SuperSport, MAXSport and Sportnet.hr.

Award	Winner	Club
Player of the Season	(Croatia) Dion Drena Beljo	Dinamo Zagreb
Young Player of the Season	(Croatia) Luka Stojković	Dinamo Zagreb
Top goalscorer	(Croatia) Dion Drena Beljo (31 goals)	Dinamo Zagreb
Manager of the Season	(Croatia) Mario Kovačević	Dinamo Zagreb
Goalkeeper of the Season	(Croatia) Marko Malenica	Osijek
Goal of the Season	(Croatia) Tomislav Duvnjak vs Hajduk (Matchday 15)	Varaždin
Save of the Season	(Croatia) Toni Silić vs Dinamo (Matchday 16)	Hajduk Split

Team of the Year
Goalkeeper	(Croatia) Marko Malenica (Osijek)			
Defence	(Croatia) Ante Oreč (Rijeka)	(Scotland) Scott McKenna (Dinamo Zagreb)	(Spain) Sergi Domínguez (Dinamo Zagreb)	(Croatia) Marko Pajač (Lokomotiva Zagreb)
Midfield	(Croatia) Luka Stojković (Dinamo Zagreb)	(Croatia) Josip Mišić (Dinamo Zagreb)		(Slovenia) Miha Zajc (Dinamo Zagreb)
Attack	(Croatia) Ante Rebić (Hajduk Split)	(Croatia) Dion Drena Beljo (Dinamo Zagreb)		(Montenegro) Aleksa Latković (Varaždin)

=== Trophy Footballer ===
Given by Croatian Association Football Union.

Award	Winner	Club
Player of the Season	(Croatia) Dion Drena Beljo	Dinamo Zagreb
Manager of the Season	(Croatia) Mario Kovačević	Dinamo Zagreb
Young Player of the Season	(Croatia) Adriano Jagušić	Slaven Belupo

Team of the Year
Goalkeeper	(Croatia) Marko Malenica (Osijek)			
Defence	(Spain) Sergi Domínguez (Dinamo Zagreb)	(Scotland) Scott McKenna (Dinamo Zagreb)	(Croatia) Ante Oreč (Rijeka)	(Croatia) Marko Pajač (Lokomotiva Zagreb)
Midfield	(Croatia) Josip Mišić (Dinamo Zagreb)	(Croatia) Toni Fruk (Rijeka)		(Croatia) Luka Stojković (Dinamo Zagreb)
Attack	(Croatia) Marko Livaja (Hajduk Split)	(Croatia) Dion Drena Beljo (Dinamo Zagreb)		(Croatia) Jakov Puljić (Vukovar 1991)

Second best Team of the Year
Goalkeeper	(Croatia) Dominik Livaković (Dinamo Zagreb)			
Defence	(Austria) Dario Marešić (Hajduk Split)	(Bosnia and Herzegovina) Stjepan Radeljić (Rijeka)	(Croatia) Frane Maglica (Varaždin)	(Croatia) Bruno Goda (Dinamo Zagreb)
Midfield	(United States) Rokas Pukštas (Hajduk Split)	(Slovenia) Miha Zajc (Dinamo Zagreb)		(Portugal) Tiago Dantas (Rijeka)
Attack	(Montenegro) Aleksa Latković (Varaždin)	(Algeria) Monsef Bakrar (Dinamo Zagreb)		(Cape Verde) Iuri Tavares (Varaždin)

== Attendances ==
Croatian Football League clubs listed by average home league attendance:

Pos	Club	Average attendance
1	Hajduk Split	19,784
2	Dinamo Zagreb	11,190
3	HNK Rijeka	5,382
4	NK Osijek	4,815
5	NK Varaždin	3,366
6	NK Istra	2,912
7	HNK Vukovar	2,030
8	HNK Gorica	1,509
9	Slaven Koprivnica	1,494
10	Lokomotiva Zagreb	900
