= Dion Drena Beljo =

Croatian footballer (born 2002)

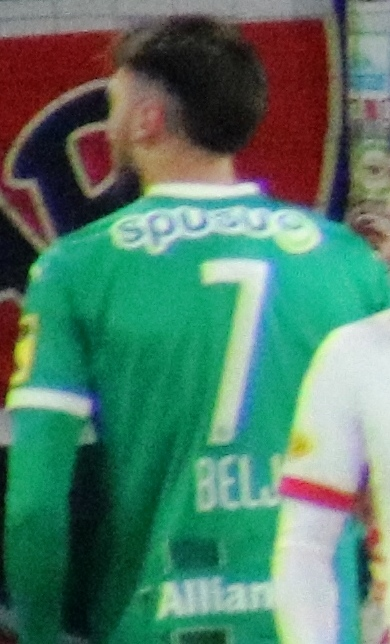
- Beljo with Rapid Wien in 2024

Personal information
- Date of birth: 1 March 2002 (age 24)
- Place of birth: Zagreb, Croatia
- Height: 1.95 m (6 ft 5 in)
- Position: Striker

Team information
- Current team: Dinamo Zagreb
- Number: 9

Youth career
- 2010–2019: Cibalia
- 2019–2021: Osijek

Senior career*
Years	Team	Apps	(Gls)
2018–2019	Cibalia	24	(9)
2019–2021	Osijek II	38	(9)
2020–2023	Osijek	31	(9)
2021–2022	→ Istra 1961 (loan)	34	(15)
2023–2025	FC Augsburg	44	(5)
2024–2025	→ Rapid Wien (loan)	29	(10)
2025–	Dinamo Zagreb	45	(43)

International career^{‡}
2018	Croatia U16	2	(0)
2018	Croatia U17	4	(0)
2019	Croatia U18	2	(0)
2019–2021	Croatia U19	5	(2)
2021–2024	Croatia U21	16	(7)
2023–	Croatia	5	(1)
Medal record
Men's football
Representing Croatia
UEFA Nations League
Runner-up	2023 Netherlands
- * Club domestic league appearances and goals as of 27 October 2026 ‡ National team caps and goals as of 15 November 2026

Dion Drena Beljo (born 1 March 2002) is a Croatian professional footballer who plays as a striker for Croatian HNL club Dinamo Zagreb and the Croatia national team.

== Club career ==
Born in Zagreb while his parents were living there, Beljo moved to Vinkovci at a young age, where he started his career with Cibalia, playing for the club's youth teams. In the 2018−19 season, he started playing for the Cibalia first team in the Druga NL, the third tier of the Croatian football league system. In his debut season, Beljo scored ten goals and nine assists, whilst his team finished in first place and secured promotion to the Prva NL. In 2019, he moved to first division club NK Osijek and signed a professional contract with the club one year later. In July 2021, moved to Istra 1961 on loan for the 2021–22 season. Beljo was a starter for Istra, appearing in 34 league matches, in which he scored 15 goals. After the end of his loan spell, he returned to Osijek, where he scored eight goals in 15 appearances during the first half of the 2022–23 season.

=== Playing abroad ===
On 13 January 2023, Beljo joined FC Augsburg on a four-and-a-half-year contract for €3 million fee. He made his Bundesliga debut on 22 January in a 3–4 loss against Borussia Dortmund. On 4 March 2023, Beljo scored his first goal for the club in a 2–1 victory against SV Werder Bremen.

On 9 July 2024, Beljo moved to Rapid Wien in Austria on a season-long loan with an option to buy.

=== Return to Croatia ===
On 16 July 2025, Beljo returned to Croatia and signed a multi-year contract with Dinamo Zagreb. He scored 31 league goals in his debut season, as his club secured their 26th Croatian league title.

== International career ==
In June 2023, Beljo was called up to the senior Croatia squad for the 2023 UEFA Nations League Finals. The same year on 12 October, he debuted in a 0–1 UEFA Euro 2024 qualifying home loss against Turkey.

== Personal life ==
Beljo is named Dion after Dionysus, the Greek God of wine, while Drena was his grandfather's nickname.

== Career statistics ==
=== Club ===
As of match played 27 October 2026

Appearances and goals by club, season and competition
Club	Season	League			National cup (Note: Includes Croatian Cup, Austrian Cup)		Europe		Other		Total	
Club	Season	Division	Apps	Goals	Apps	Goals	Apps	Goals	Apps	Goals	Apps	Goals
Osijek II	2019–20	2. HNL	14	4	—		—		—		14	4
Osijek II	2020–21	2. HNL	24	5	—		—		—		24	5
Osijek II	Total		38	9	—		—		—		38	9
Osijek	2019–20	1. HNL	6	0	0	0	0	0	—		6	0
Osijek	2020–21	1. HNL	9	1	1	0	0	0	—		10	1
Osijek	2022–23	1. HNL	16	8	2	1	1 (Note: Appearance in UEFA Europa Conference League)	0	—		19	9
Osijek	Total		31	9	3	1	1	0	—		35	10
Istra 1961 (loan)	2021–22	1. HNL	34	15	3	5	—		—		37	20
FC Augsburg	2022–23	Bundesliga	18	3	—		—		—		18	3
FC Augsburg	2023–24	Bundesliga	26	2	1	0	—		—		27	2
FC Augsburg	Total		44	5	1	0	—		—		45	5
Rapid Wien (loan)	2024–25	Austrian Bundesliga	29	10	3	3	16 (Note: Six appearances and one goal in UEFA Europa League, ten appearances and five goals in UEFA Conference League)	5	1 (Note: Appearance in Austrian Bundesliga European play-offs)	0	49	18
Dinamo Zagreb	2025–26	1. HNL	36	31	4	2	8 (Note: Appearances in UEFA Europa League)	5	—		48	38
Dinamo Zagreb	2026–27	1. HNL	9	12	0	0	8 (Note: Six appearances and two goals in UEFA Champions League, two appearances and three goals in UEFA Europa League)	5	—		17	17
Dinamo Zagreb	Total		45	43	4	2	16	10	—		65	55
Career total			221	89	14	11	33	15	1	0	269	115

=== International ===
As of match played 15 November 2026

Appearances and goals by national team and year
National team	Year	Apps	Goals
Croatia	2023	2	0
Croatia	2024	0	0
Croatia	2025	0	0
Croatia	2026	3	1
Total		5	1

Croatia score listed first, score column indicates score after each Beljo goal.

List of international goals scored by Dion Drena Beljo
No.	Date	Venue	Cap	Opponent	Score	Result	Competition
1	29 September 2026	Ramón Sánchez-Pizjuán, Seville, Spain	3	Spain	1–1	1–4	2026–27 UEFA Nations League A

== Honours ==
Dinamo Zagreb

- HNL: 2025–26
- Croatian Cup: 2025–26

Croatia

- UEFA Nations League: runner-up 2023

Individual

- HNL Top Goalscorer: 2025–26
- HNL Player of the Season: 2025–26
