= Luka Stojković =

Croatian footballer

Personal information
- Date of birth: 28 October 2003 (age 23)
- Place of birth: Zagreb, Croatia
- Height: 1.82 m (6 ft 0 in)
- Position: Attacking midfielder

Team information
- Current team: Dinamo Zagreb
- Number: 10

Youth career
- 2016–2021: Lokomotiva Zagreb

Senior career*
Years	Team	Apps	(Gls)
2021–2023	Lokomotiva Zagreb	62	(5)
2023–	Dinamo Zagreb	63	(15)

International career^{‡}
2019	Croatia U16	6	(2)
2021	Croatia U18	1	(0)
2021–2022	Croatia U19	13	(3)
2022	Croatia U20	4	(1)
2023–	Croatia U21	8	(0)
- * Club domestic league appearances and goals as of 27 October 2026 ‡ National team caps and goals as of 20 November 2024

Luka Stojković (born 28 October 2003) is a Croatian footballer who plays as an attacking midfielder for Dinamo Zagreb.

== Early life and career ==
Stojković was born in Zagreb and raised in Novoselec near Ivanić-Grad, where he trained with local clubs NK Sloga Križ and Naftaš Ivanić before moving to NK Lokomotiva Zagreb in 2016.

== Career statistics ==
=== Club ===
As of 27 October 2026.

Club	Season	League			Cup		Continental		Other		Total	
Club	Season	Division	Apps	Goals	Apps	Goals	Apps	Goals	Apps	Goals	Apps	Goals
Lokomotiva Zagreb	2020–21	SuperSport HNL	5	0	0	0	0	0	0	0	5	0
Lokomotiva Zagreb	2021–22	SuperSport HNL	26	1	2 (Note: Appearances in the Croatian Cup)	0	0	0	0	0	28	1
Lokomotiva Zagreb	2022–23	SuperSport HNL	30	4	3	0	0	0	0	0	33	4
Lokomotiva Zagreb	2023–24	SuperSport HNL	4	2	0	0	0	0	0	0	4	2
Lokomotiva Zagreb	Total		65	7	5	0	0	0	0	0	70	7
Dinamo Zagreb	2023–24	SuperSport HNL	1	0	0	0	1 (Note: Appearance in UEFA Europa League)	0	0	0	2	0
Dinamo Zagreb	2024–25	SuperSport HNL	26	6	3	0	6 (Note: Appearances in UEFA Champions League)	0	0	0	35	6
Dinamo Zagreb	2025–26	SuperSport HNL	29	7	4	4	9	2	—		42	13
Dinamo Zagreb	2026–27	SuperSport HNL	8	2	1	2	7 (Note: Four appearances and one goal in UEFA Champions League, three appearances in UEFA Europa League)	1	—		15	5
Dinamo Zagreb	Total		63	15	8	6	23	3	0	0	94	24
Career total			125	20	13	6	23	3	0	0	161	29

== Honours ==
Dinamo Zagreb

- Croatian Football League: 2025–26
- Croatian Cup: 2025–26
