= Gabriel Vidović =

Croatian footballer (born 2003)

Personal information
- Full name: Gabriel Vidović
- Date of birth: 1 December 2003 (age 22)
- Place of birth: Augsburg, Germany
- Height: 1.80 m (5 ft 11 in)
- Position: Attacking midfielder

Team information
- Current team: SC Paderborn
- Number: 40

Youth career
- FC Augsburg
- 2016–2021: Bayern Munich

Senior career*
Years	Team	Apps	(Gls)
2021–2022	Bayern Munich II	33	(21)
2022–2025	Bayern Munich	8	(0)
2022–2023	→ Vitesse (loan)	25	(4)
2023–2024	→ Dinamo Zagreb (loan)	27	(7)
2024–2025	→ Mainz 05 (loan)	1	(0)
2025–2026	Dinamo Zagreb	28	(7)
2026–	SC Paderborn	8	(0)

International career^{‡}
2020	Croatia U17	3	(1)
2021	Croatia U18	3	(0)
2021	Croatia U19	3	(1)
2021–2024	Croatia U21	21	(2)
- * Club domestic league appearances and goals as of 31 October 2026 ‡ National team caps and goals as of 19 November 2024

Gabriel Vidović (Croatian pronunciation: [ɡàbriel vȉdovitɕ]; born 1 December 2003) is a professional footballer who plays as an attacking midfielder for Bundesliga club SC Paderborn. Born in Germany, he represented Croatia at youth level internationally.

== Club career ==
=== Early career ===
Vidović started his career playing for his hometown club, FC Augsburg.

=== Bayern Munich ===
On 2016, Vidović joined the youth academy of Bayern Munich. After good performances for Bayern Munich II in the Regionalliga, he signed a new contract with Bayern Munich until 2025.

Later on, coach Julian Nagelsmann called Vidović to join the first team, in which he earned his Bundesliga debut on 17 April 2022, coming on as a substitute to Serge Gnabry, in a 3–0 win over Arminia Bielefeld.

On 11 June 2025, Bayern Munich announced their 32-player final squad for the FIFA Club World Cup, which included Vidović.

==== Loan to Vitesse ====
On 30 August 2022, Vidović joined Eredivisie club Vitesse, on loan for the 2022–23 season.

==== Loan to Dinamo Zagreb ====
On 30 August 2023, Vidović was loaned to SuperSport HNL club Dinamo Zagreb, with an option to make the move permanent.

==== Loan to Mainz 05 ====
On 30 August 2024, Vidović extended his contract with Bayern Munich until 2026, and was subsequently loaned to fellow Bundesliga club Mainz 05 for the 2024–25 season. On 3 February 2025, his loan spell with Mainz 05 was cut short, as he was recalled to his parent club Bayern Munich, following the departure of Mathys Tel to English Premier League club Tottenham Hotspur.

=== Dinamo Zagreb ===
On 17 June 2025, Vidović was transferred permanently and signed a contract with SuperSport HNL club Dinamo Zagreb, returning to the club in Croatia.

=== SC Paderborn ===
On 18 August 2026, he returned to Germany and transferred permanently to recently promoted Bundesliga club SC Paderborn, ahead of the 2026–27 season.

== International career ==
Vidović was called up to Germany U15 sides before he became part of various Croatian junior national teams.

== Personal life ==
Born in Germany, Vidović is of Bosnian Croat descent. His father hails from Žepče and his mother hails from Kiseljak.

== Career statistics ==
As of match played 31 October 2026

Appearances and goals by club, season and competition
Club	Season	League			National cup (Note: Includes Croatian Cup, DFB-Pokal)		Europe		Total	
Club	Season	Division	Apps	Goals	Apps	Goals	Apps	Goals	Apps	Goals
Bayern Munich	2021–22	Bundesliga	3	0	0	0	0	0	3	0
Bayern Munich	2022–23	Bundesliga	1	0	0	0	0	0	1	0
Bayern Munich	2024–25	Bundesliga	4	0	0	0	0	0	4	0
Bayern Munich	Total		8	0	0	0	0	0	8	0
Bayern Munich II	2021–22	Regionalliga Bayern	30	21	—		—		30	21
Bayern Munich II	2022–23	Regionalliga Bayern	3	0	—		—		3	0
Bayern Munich II	Total		33	21	—		—		33	21
Vitesse (loan)	2022–23	Eredivisie	25	4	0	0	—		25	4
Dinamo Zagreb (loan)	2023–24	HNL	27	7	4	1	9 (Note: Appearances in UEFA Europa Conference League)	1	40	9
Mainz 05 (loan)	2024–25	Bundesliga	2	0	1	0	0	0	3	0
Dinamo Zagreb	2025–26	HNL	26	7	5	0	7 (Note: Appearances in UEFA Europa League)	0	38	7
Dinamo Zagreb	2026–27	HNL	1	0	0	0	4 (Note: Appearances in UEFA Champions League)	0	5	0
Dinamo Zagreb	Total		27	7	5	0	11	0	43	7
SC Paderborn	2026–27	Bundesliga	8	0	1	1	—		9	1
Career total			130	39	11	2	20	1	161	42

== Honours ==
Bayern Munich

- Bundesliga: 2021–22, 2024–25

Dinamo Zagreb

- HNL: 2023–24
- Croatian Cup: 2023–24
