= Matteo Pérez Vinlöf =

Swedish footballer (born 2005)

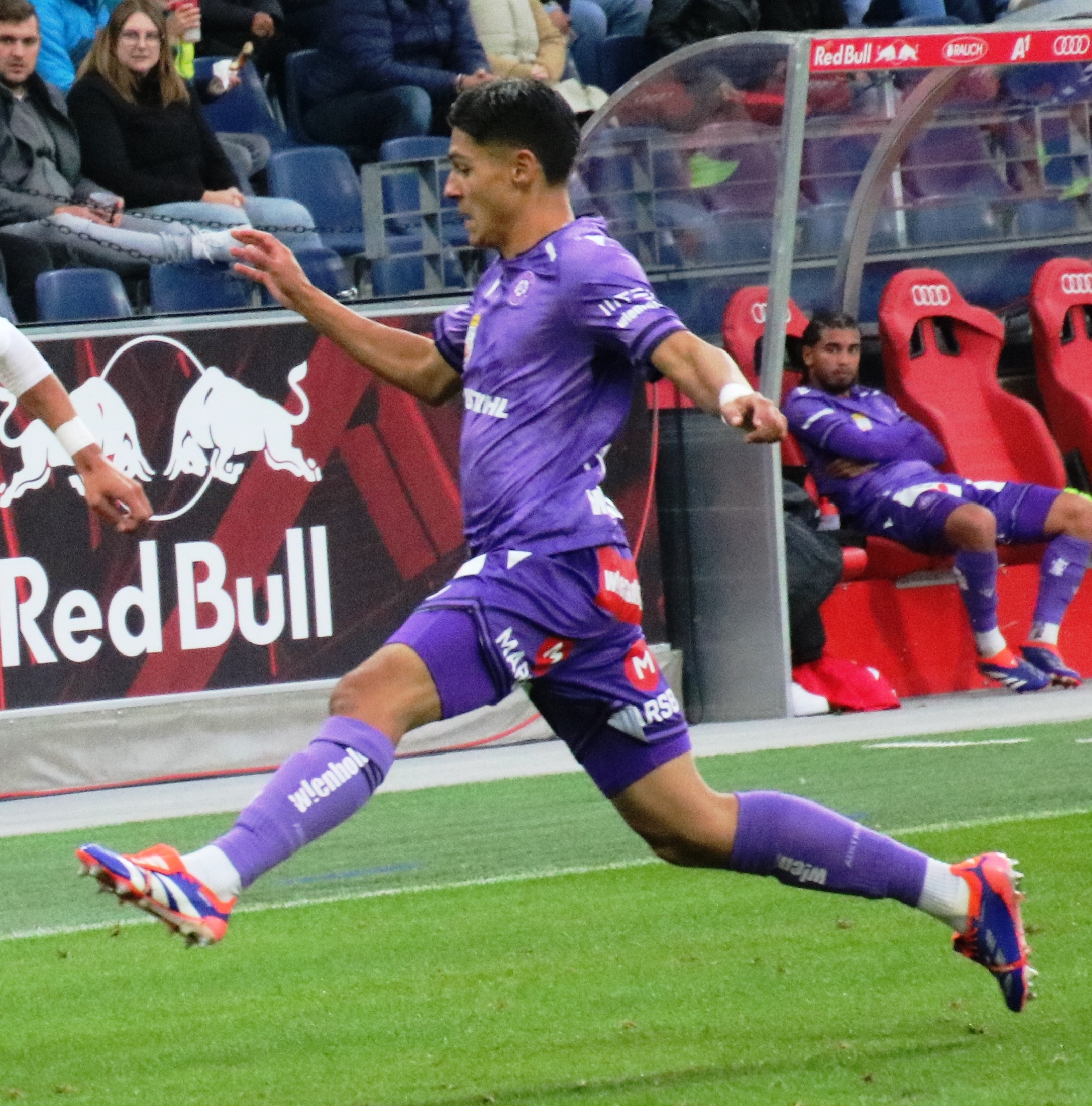
- Pérez Vinlöf in 2024 with Austria Wien

Personal information
- Full name: Olof Matteo Pérez Vinlöf
- Date of birth: 18 December 2005 (age 20)
- Place of birth: Stockholm, Sweden
- Height: 1.78 m (5 ft 10 in)
- Position: Left-back

Team information
- Current team: Dinamo Zagreb
- Number: 22

Youth career
- IF Brommapojkarna
- 2021–2022: Hammarby IF
- 2022–2023: Bayern Munich

Senior career*
Years	Team	Apps	(Gls)
2023–2025	Bayern Munich II	26	(1)
2024–2025	Bayern Munich	1	(0)
2024–2025	→ Austria Wien (loan)	31	(1)
2025–	Dinamo Zagreb	32	(0)

International career^{‡}
2021–2022	Sweden U17	13	(0)
2022–2023	Sweden U19	4	(0)
2024–2025	Sweden U21	12	(2)
- * Club domestic league appearances and goals as of 27 October 2026 ‡ National team caps and goals as of 18:39, 18 November 2025 (UTC)

Olof Matteo Pérez Vinlöf (born 18 December 2005) is a Swedish professional footballer who plays as a left-back for SuperSport HNL club Dinamo Zagreb.

== Early life ==
Pérez Vinlöf was born in Stockholm, Sweden, to a Peruvian father and Swedish mother.

== Club career ==
=== Early career ===
Initially beginning his career at IF Brommapojkarna, Pérez Vinlöf trialled with Peruvian side Sporting Cristal in 2019, before joining Hammarby IF in 2021.

=== Bayern Munich ===
In January 2022, it was reported by Swedish newspaper Sportbladet that he was close to a move to German champions Bayern Munich, having trialled with the Bavarian side in 2021. The move was officially confirmed by Bayern Munich on 19 January, with Pérez Vinlöf signing a three-year deal.

On 20 April 2024, he scored his first goal for Bayern Munich II in a 2–0 against SpVgg Ansbach. A month later, on 12 May, he made his Bundesliga debut for Bayern Munich's senior team, coming off the bench to substitute Bryan Zaragoza, in a 2–0 win over VfL Wolfsburg.

==== Loan to Austria Wien ====
Later that same year, on 12 July, he signed a new contract with Bayern Munich until 2027 and was subsequently loaned out to Austrian Bundesliga club Austria Wien for the 2024–25 season.

=== Dinamo Zagreb ===
On 23 June 2025, Croatian SuperSport HNL club Dinamo Zagreb announced the signing of Pérez Vinlöf, set to join permanently for the 2025–26 season.

== International career ==
Pérez Vinlöf has represented Sweden at under-17 and under-19 level. He remains eligible to represent Peru, and in July 2022, it was reported by Spanish newspaper Diario AS that Pérez Vinlöf was looking to switch his international allegiance to Peru, with the recruitment department of the Peruvian Football Federation stating that they had planned for Pérez Vinlöf to travel to Peru for trials. Despite this, he went on to represent Sweden at under-19 level the following year.

In May 2024, he received his first call-up with the senior Sweden national team as he was one of the 27 players called up for the friendly matches against Denmark and Serbia on 5 and 8 June 2024, respectively.

== Career statistics ==
=== Club ===
As of 27 October 2026

Appearances and goals by club, season and competition
Club	Season	League			Cup		Europe		Other		Total	
Club	Season	Division	Apps	Goals	Apps	Goals	Apps	Goals	Apps	Goals	Apps	Goals
Bayern Munich II	2023–24	Regionalliga Bayern	26	1	—		—		—		26	1
Bayern Munich	2023–24	Bundesliga	1	0	—		—		—		1	0
Austria Wien (loan)	2024–25	Austrian Bundesliga	31	1	5	0	—		2 (Note: Appearances in UEFA Conference League)	0	38	1
Dinamo Zagreb	2025–26	SuperSport HNL	24	0	1	0	—		5 (Note: Appearances in UEFA Europa League)	0	30	0
Dinamo Zagreb	2026–27	SuperSport HNL	8	0	1	0	—		7 (Note: Five appearances in UEFA Champions League, two appearances in UEFA Europa League)	0	16	0
Dinamo Zagreb	Total		32	0	2	0	—		12	0	46	0
Career total			90	2	7	0	0	0	14	0	111	2
