= Monsef Bakrar =

Algerian footballer (born 2001)

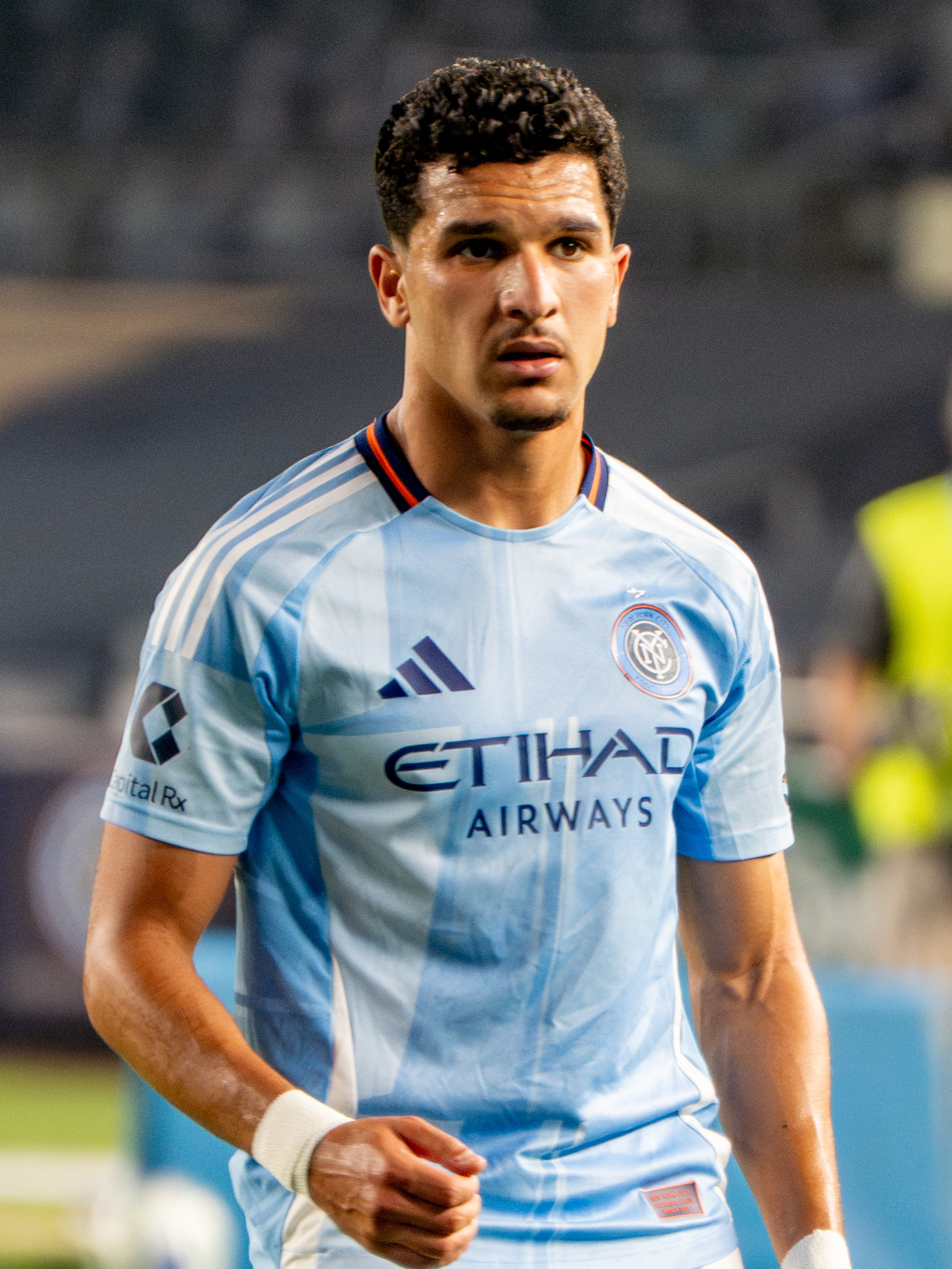
- Bakrar with New York City FC in 2025

Personal information
- Date of birth: 13 January 2001 (age 25)
- Place of birth: Sétif, Algeria
- Height: 1.83 m (6 ft 0 in)
- Position: Forward

Team information
- Current team: Al Ahly
- Number: 10

Youth career
- ES Sétif

Senior career*
Years	Team	Apps	(Gls)
2020–2022	ES Sétif	38	(9)
2022–2023	Istra 1961	31	(8)
2023–2025	New York City FC	59	(9)
2025–2026	Dinamo Zagreb	28	(10)
2026-	Al Ahly	0	(0)

International career^{‡}
2022	Algeria U23	4	(1)
2024–	Algeria	7	(0)
- * Club domestic league appearances and goals as of 16 August 2026 ‡ National team caps and goals as of 31 December 2025

Monsef Bakrar (born 13 January 2001) is an Algerian professional footballer who plays as a forward for Egyptian Premier League club Al Ahly and the Algeria national team.

== Club career ==
On 20 July 2022, Bakrar signed a one-year contract with Istra. On 11 July 2023, Bakrar signed a 3 1/2-year deal with Major League Soccer side New York City FC.

On 1 August 2025, Bakrar returned to Croatia, signing a multi-year contract with Dinamo Zagreb.

On July 28, Al Ahly SC officially announced the signing of the player, who had been recommended by Amr. Following an evaluation by the club's scouting committee, there was unanimous agreement that the club should enter negotiations to secure his signing.

== International career ==
Bakrar made his debut for the senior Algeria national team on 22 March 2024, in a friendly against Bolivia.

== Career statistics ==
=== Club ===
As of match played 13 May 2026

Appearances and goals by club, season, and competition
Club	Season	League			National cup (Note: Includes Croatian Cup, U.S. Open Cup)		Continental		Other		Total	
Club	Season	Division	Apps	Goals	Apps	Goals	Apps	Goals	Apps	Goals	Apps	Goals
ES Sétif	2020–21	Algerian Ligue 1	17	3	—		3 (Note: Appearance(s) in CAF Confederation Cup)	1	—		20	4
ES Sétif	2021–22	Algerian Ligue 1	21	6	—		9 (Note: Appearance(s) in CAF Champions League)	0	—		30	6
ES Sétif	Total		38	9	—		12	1	—		50	10
Istra 1961	2022–23	Croatian Football League	31	8	2	0	—		—		33	8
New York City FC	2023	MLS	10	3	—		—		3 (Note: Appearance(s) in Leagues Cup)	1	13	4
New York City FC	2024	MLS	28	4	0	0	—		7 (Note: Four appearances in Leagues Cup, three appearances in MLS Cup playoffs)	0	35	4
New York City FC	2025	MLS	21	2	1	0	—		—		22	2
New York City FC	Total		59	9	1	0	—		10	1	70	10
Dinamo Zagreb	2025–26	Croatian Football League	28	10	4	5	9 (Note: Appearances in UEFA Europa League)	2	—		40	17
Career total			156	36	7	5	21	3	10	1	194	45

=== International ===
As of match played 31 December 2025

Appearances and goals by national team and year
National team	Year	Apps	Goals
Algeria	2024	4	0
Algeria	2025	3	0
Total		7	0

== Honours ==
Dinamo Zagreb

- HNL: 2025–26
- Croatian Football Cup: 2025–26

Individual

- New York City FC Player of the Month: August 2023
- HNL Team of the Season (Second Team): 2025–26

== See also ==
- List of Algeria international footballers
