= Mario Kovačević =

Croatian association football manager and former football player

Personal information
- Date of birth: 17 May 1975 (age 51)
- Place of birth: Doljani, SR Bosnia and Herzegovina, Yugoslavia
- Position: Midfielder

Youth career
- 1984–1986: Turbina Jablanica
- 1986–1994: Sarajevo

Senior career*
Years	Team	Apps	(Gls)
1994–1997	Varteks	23	(2)
1997–1998	Podravina		
1998–2003	Slaven Belupo	99	(1)
2003–2007	Međimurje	30	(0)
2007	Nafta Lendava	12	(1)
2007–2008	Nedelišće		
2008	Radnički Gardinovec		
2008–2009	Čakovec		
2009	Radnički Gardinovec		
2009	Spartak Mala Subotica		
2009–2012	Hodošan		
2012	Zagorac Donji Kneginec		
2012–2014	Varteks	14	(7)
2014–2018	Dinamo Apatija	76	(25)
2018–2024	Drava Kuršanec	48	(5)

Managerial career
- Nedelišće (player/coach)
- 2008–2009: Međimurje
- Čakovec
- 2011: Strmec Bedenica
- 2011: Varaždin (assistant)
- 2012: Strmec Bedenica
- 2014–2017: Međimurje
- 2017–2018: Varaždin
- 2018–2020: Polet Sveti Martin na Muri
- 2020: Podravina
- 2021: Međimurje
- 2021: Mladost Ždralovi
- 2021–2022: Varaždin
- 2022–2023: Varaždin (assistant)
- 2023: Varaždin
- 2024–2025: Slaven Belupo
- 2025–2026: Dinamo Zagreb
- * Club domestic league appearances and goals

Mario Kovačević (born 17 May 1975) is a Bosnian-born Croatian professional football manager and former professional player who was most recently the manager of Croatian Football League club Dinamo Zagreb.

== Playing career ==
Kovačević was a central midfielder for several Croatian clubs, including Međimurje, Slaven Belupo, and Varteks.

== Managerial statistics ==
As of match played 31 October 2026

Managerial record by team and tenure
Team	From	To	Record				
Team	From	To	G	W	D	L	Win %
Međimurje	7 March 2014	30 June 2017	4	2	0	2	50.00
Varaždin	11 September 2017	30 June 2018	31	18	5	8	58.06
Polet Sveti Martin na Muri	1 November 2018	24 September 2020	1	1	0	0	100.00
Međimurje	1 January 2021	8 March 2021	5	0	2	3	0.00
Varaždin	21 September 2021	7 July 2022	25	18	3	4	72.00
Varaždin	14 January 2023	3 December 2023	37	10	14	13	27.03
Slaven Belupo	3 September 2024	4 June 2025	37	17	9	11	45.95
Dinamo Zagreb	4 June 2025	1 November 2026	73	48	11	14	65.75
Career total			213	114	44	55	53.52

== Honours ==
=== Player ===
Međimurje

- Croatian Second League: 2003–04

=== Manager ===
Varaždin

- Croatian Second League: 2021–22

Dinamo Zagreb

- Croatian Football League: 2025–26
- Croatian Cup: 2025–26
