= Cardoso Varela =

Footballer (born 2008)

Personal information
- Full name: Cardoso Pinto Mandume Varela
- Date of birth: 29 October 2008 (age 17)
- Place of birth: Luanda, Angola
- Height: 1.83 m (6 ft 0 in)
- Position: Winger

Team information
- Current team: Porto B
- Number: 47

Youth career
- –2024: Porto
- 2025–: Dinamo Zagreb

Senior career*
Years	Team	Apps	(Gls)
2025–2026	Dinamo Zagreb	14	(0)
2026–	Porto B	4	(0)

International career^{‡}
2022	Portugal U15	3	(0)
2023–	Portugal U17	22	(3)
Medal record
Men's football
Representing Portugal
UEFA European Under-17 Championship
Runner-up	2024 Cyprus
- * Club domestic league appearances and goals as of 10 October 2026 ‡ National team caps and goals as of 18 February 2024 (UTC)

Cardoso Pinto Mandume Varela (born 29 October 2008) is a professional footballer who plays as a winger for Liga Portugal 2 club Porto B. Born in Angola, he is a youth international for Portugal.

== Early life ==
Varela was born in Angola and acquired Portuguese citizenship on 6 July 2022.

== Club career ==
After becoming eligible for a professional contract, talks between Varela and Porto turned sour, prompting the player to attempt to sign for Croatian amateur club NK Dinamo Odranski Obrež. However this registration was denied by FIFA. After months of speculation, Dinamo Zagreb officially signed Varela, reported to be for a three-year contract.

On 20 June 2026, he signed a three-year contract with Porto, initially re-joining the club's reserve team, competing in Liga Portugal 2.

== International career ==
Varela was the youngest member of Portugal U17 team that were runner-ups of the 2024 UEFA European Under-17 Championship in Cyprus.

== Career statistics ==
As of match played 23 May 2026

Appearances and goals by club, season and competition
Club	Season	League			Cup		Europe		Other		Total	
Club	Season	Division	Apps	Goals	Apps	Goals	Apps	Goals	Apps	Goals	Apps	Goals
Dinamo Zagreb	2025–26	Croatian Football League	14	0	3	1	8 (Note: Appearances in UEFA Europa League)	1	0	0	25	2
Career total			14	0	3	1	8	1	0	0	25	2
