= Aleks Stojaković =

Slovenian footballer (born 2004)

Personal information
- Date of birth: 17 February 2004 (age 22)
- Place of birth: Celje, Slovenia
- Height: 1.95 m (6 ft 5 in)
- Positions: Midfielder; winger; forward

Team information
- Current team: Dinamo
- Number: 19

Youth career
- –2022: Rudar

Senior career*
Years	Team	Apps	(Gls)
2022–2023	Kurilovec	33	(2)
2023–2024	Brinje	30	(8)
2024–2025	Jarun	20	(2)
2025–2026	Lokomotiva	34	(8)
2026–	Dinamo	0	(0)

International career^{‡}
2025–2026	Slovenia U21	2	(0)
- * Club domestic league appearances and goals ‡ National team caps and goals as of 31 March 2026

Aleks Stojaković (born 17 February 2004) is a Slovenian professional footballer who plays as a midfielder, winger, or forward for Dinamo.

== Early life ==
Stojaković was born on 17 February 2004. Born in Slovenia, he is a native of Žalec, Slovenia.

== Club career ==
As a youth player, Stojaković joined the youth academy of Rudar. Following his stint there, he signed for Croatian side Kurilovec in 2022, where he made thirty-three league appearances and scored two goals. One year later, he signed for Brinje, before signing for Jarun in Croatia in 2024, where he mainly played as a midfielder or winger.

Subsequently, he signed for Croatian outfit Lokomotiva in 2025, where he was regarded to have established himself as a regular starter while playing for the club. Ahead of the 2026–27 season, he signed for Dinamo in Croatia.

== International career ==
Stojaković is a Slovenia youth international and has represent the country internationally at under-21 level. During the autumn of 2025 and the spring of 2026, he played for the Slovenia national under-21 football team for 2027 UEFA European Under-21 Championship qualification.

== Style of play ==
Stojaković plays as a midfielder, winger, or forward and is right-footed. Croatian news website Telegram.hr wrote in 2026 that he is "a player profile that is equally good at the position of central striker and winger... [bringing] additional width and sharpen the competition in attack".
