= Aleksa Latković =

Montenegrin footballer (born 2000)

Personal information
- Date of birth: 30 October 2000 (age 26)
- Place of birth: Cetinje, FR Yugoslavia
- Height: 1.78 m (5 ft 10 in)
- Position: Attacking midfielder

Team information
- Current team: Varaždin
- Number: 10

Youth career
- –2017: Lovćen

Senior career*
Years	Team	Apps	(Gls)
2017–2019	Lovćen	25	(2)
2019–2021	Osijek II	39	(9)
2021–2024	Rudeš	86	(15)
2024–	Varaždin	68	(12)

International career^{‡}
2017–2018	Montenegro U19	6	(0)
2020–2022	Montenegro U21	4	(0)
2026–	Montenegro	2	(1)
- * Club domestic league appearances and goals as of 23 September 2026 ‡ National team caps and goals as of 3 October 2026

Aleksa Latković (Montenegrin: Алекса Латковић; born 30 October 2000) is a Montenegrin professional footballer who plays as an attacking midfielder for Varaždin and the Montenegro national team.

== Club career ==
Latković played in Rudeš before joining fellow Croatian team Varaždin.

== International career ==
Latković received his first call up to the Montenegrin senior team by coach Mirko Vučinić for the friendlies against Bulgaria and Slovakia, on 1 June 2026 and 5 June 2026, respectively.

== Career statistics ==
=== International ===
As of match played 2 October 2026

Appearances and goals by national team and year
National team	Year	Apps	Goals
Montenegro	2026	2	1
Total		2	1

Scores and results list Montenegro's goal tally first, score column indicates score after each Latković goal.

List of international goals scored by Aleksa Latković
No.	Date	Venue	Opponent	Score	Result	Competition
1	28 September 2026	Vazgen Sargsyan Republican Stadium, Yerevan, Armenia	Armenia	3–2	3–2	2026–27 UEFA Nations League C
