= Miha Zajc =

Slovenian footballer (born 1994)

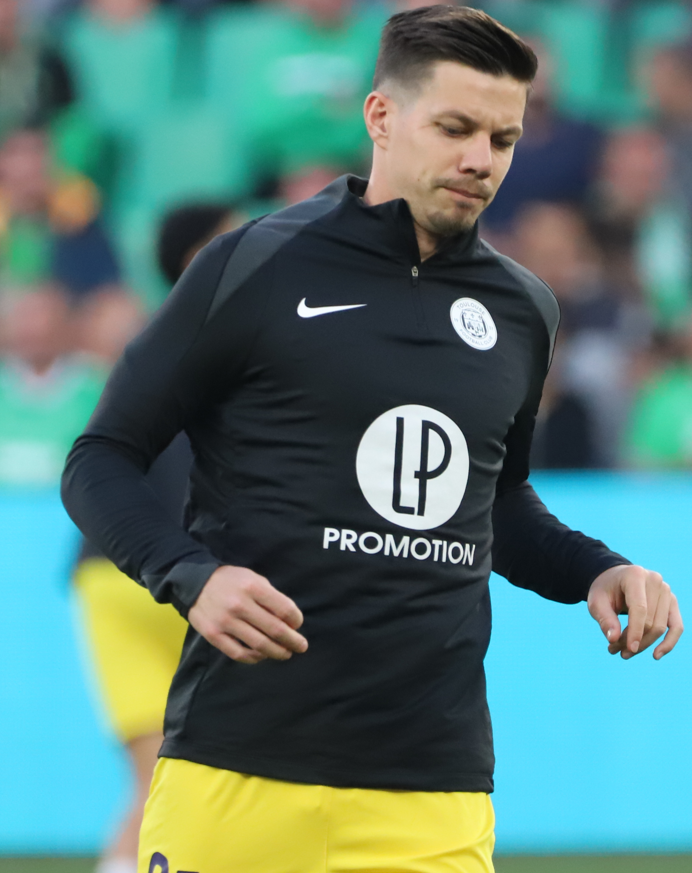
- Zajc with Toulouse in 2025

Personal information
- Date of birth: 1 July 1994 (age 32)
- Place of birth: Šempeter pri Gorici, Slovenia
- Height: 1.80 m (5 ft 11 in)
- Position: Midfielder

Team information
- Current team: Dinamo Zagreb
- Number: 8

Youth career
- –2009: Bilje
- 2009–2012: Interblock
- 2012: Olimpija Ljubljana

Senior career*
Years	Team	Apps	(Gls)
2012	Interblock	5	(0)
2012–2014	Bravo	0	(0)
2012	→ Olimpija Ljubljana (loan)	1	(2)
2013–2014	→ Celje (loan)	51	(2)
2014–2017	Olimpija Ljubljana	70	(16)
2017–2019	Empoli	66	(12)
2019–2025	Fenerbahçe	86	(15)
2020–2021	→ Genoa (loan)	31	(1)
2024–2025	→ Toulouse (loan)	19	(0)
2025–	Dinamo Zagreb	24	(8)

International career
2010	Slovenia U17 (Note: Official competitive UEFA matches only.)	2	(0)
2012	Slovenia U19	3	(0)
2013	Slovenia U20	1	(0)
2013–2016	Slovenia U21	10	(1)
2016–2023	Slovenia	39	(8)
2017	Slovenia B	2	(0)
- * Club domestic league appearances and goals as of 9 May 2026

Miha Zajc (born 1 July 1994) is a Slovenian footballer who plays as a midfielder for Croatian Football League club Dinamo Zagreb.

== Club career ==
=== Interblock ===
Zajc was born in Šempeter pri Gorici. As a youngster, he played in the youth selections of Interblock from the capital of Ljubljana. He made his senior debut on 3 March 2012 against Dravinja and made a total of five league appearances in his first and last year at Interblock.

==== Loan to Olimpija and Celje ====
In summer 2012 Zajc moved to Olimpija Ljubljana. He played only one game with the club, against Mura 05 in the Slovenian PrvaLiga, where he scored two goals in a 3–1 victory. Zajc moved on loan to Celje in January 2013. He made his league debut with Celje on 2 March 2013, starting the match in a 0–0 draw against Gorica. The loan was also confirmed for the following season, after which he scored his first goal on 30 October 2013, in a 3–1 home defeat against Rudar Velenje during the second leg of the quarter-finals of the Slovenian Cup. On 12 April 2014 he scored his first goal in the Slovenian PrvaLiga with Celje, scoring the team's second goal in a 2–0 home win over Triglav Kranj.

=== Olimpija Ljubljana ===
Zajc returned to Olimpija on a permanent basis in August 2014, signing a three-year contract. He made his second debut for Olimpija on 16 August 2014 in a 2–0 league victory against Rudar Velenje. With Olimpija, he won the 2015–16 PrvaLiga title. His last season with the club was the 2016–17 season, in which he scored 7 goals before leaving the club in the winter transfer window. In his three seasons with Olimpija, he made 70 appearances and collected 16 goals in the Slovenian PrvaLiga.

=== Empoli ===
Zajc moved to Empoli on 25 January 2017, and signed a four-year contract. He debuted in Serie A on 29 January in a 4–1 defeat against Crotone. In his first season, he made five appearances and scored one goal in Serie A. However, Empoli was relegated to Serie B at the end of the season. Zajc made 41 appearances in the 2017–18 Serie B season, scoring 8 goals and as many as 14 assists, making a fundamental contribution to Empoli's return to Serie A. In the following season, Zajc played 20 games in the 2018–19 Serie A with the Tuscan club, scoring 3 goals and providing 2 assists. However, Zajc did not finish the season with Empoli as he changed the club in the winter transfer window.

=== Fenerbahçe ===
Zajc moved to Fenerbahçe in the midst of the 2018–19 season, making 10 appearances in the 2018–19 Süper Lig. That year Fenerbahçe reached the round of 32 in the UEFA Europa League, and finished sixth in the national championship. In the next season, in which he suffered an ankle ligaments injury, Zajc played only 17 games with Fenerbahçe, scoring two goals.

During the 2021–22 season, Fenerbahçe had managerial changes. First under Vitor Pereira and then especially under İsmail Kartal, Zajc solidified his starter role. He started to find more time in first team than in his first two seasons and became one of the key players along with Miguel Crespo. He consistently earned and played full 90-minute matches, showcasing his progress and scored 9 goals in 41 matches across all competitions.

On 31 July 2023, Zajc signed a new contract with Fenerbahçe until 2026 after his previous contract expired.

==== Loan to Genoa ====
Zajc moved to Italian side Genoa in September 2020, on a one-year loan. With Genoa he reached the round of 16 in the 2020–21 Coppa Italia, and placed eleventh in the 2020–21 Serie A. Zajc made 31 league appearances during the season, provided 3 assists and also scored one goal, against Bologna on 9 January 2021. During his time at Genoa he contributed to the club's positive performances in Serie A, especially with his assists.

==== Loan to Toulouse ====
On 31 August 2024, he went on a season-long loan to French Ligue 1 side Toulouse.

== International career ==
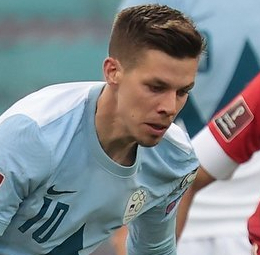
Zajc playing for Slovenia in 2021

Between 2009 and 2016, Zajc played for Slovenia at all youth international levels from under-16 to under-21. In March 2016, he debuted for the senior team during a friendly match against Macedonia.

== Style of play ==
Zajc is a trequartista who can be employed behind one or two strikers, and can also play as a central midfielder. When needed he has also played as a deep-lying playmaker and left midfielder. He is considered a very technical player, and among his qualities are his set pieces ability and ability to defend the ball. Zajc is endowed with tactical vision and strategic planning. He is a right footed, and also has good dribbling skills and a good long-range shot.

Zajc has stated that he is inspired by Luka Modrić.

== Reception ==
After moving to Empoli, Zajc impressed with his performances in Italy, leading Empoli to its promotion to Serie A. A talented player, his continuity has sometimes been criticized.

== Career statistics ==
=== Club ===
As of match played 3 May 2025

Appearances and goals by club, season and competition
Club	Season	League			National cup (Note: Includes Slovenian Cup, Coppa Italia, Turkish Cup, Coupe de France)		Continental		Total	
Club	Season	Division	Apps	Goals	Apps	Goals	Apps	Goals	Apps	Goals
Interblock	2011–12	2. SNL	5	0	—		—		5	0
Olimpija Ljubljana (loan)	2012–13	1. SNL	1	2	0	0	0	0	1	2
Celje (loan)	2012–13	1. SNL	12	0	3	0	—		15	0
Celje (loan)	2013–14	1. SNL	36	2	3	1	2 (Note: Appearances in UEFA Europa League)	0	41	3
Celje (loan)	2014–15	1. SNL	3	0	0	0	—		3	0
Celje (loan)	Total		51	2	6	1	2	0	59	3
Olimpija Ljubljana	2014–15	1. SNL	19	4	4	0	—		23	4
Olimpija Ljubljana	2015–16	1. SNL	32	5	3	0	—		35	5
Olimpija Ljubljana	2016–17	1. SNL	19	7	3	1	2 (Note: Appearances in UEFA Champions League)	1	24	9
Olimpija Ljubljana	Total		70	16	10	1	2	1	82	18
Empoli	2016–17	Serie A	5	1	0	0	—		5	1
Empoli	2017–18	Serie B	41	8	1	0	—		42	8
Empoli	2018–19	Serie A	20	3	1	0	—		21	3
Empoli	Total		66	12	2	0	0	0	68	12
Fenerbahçe	2018–19	Süper Lig	10	2	0	0	0	0	10	2
Fenerbahçe	2019–20	Süper Lig	10	1	7	1	—		17	2
Fenerbahçe	2021–22	Süper Lig	32	9	1	0	8 (Note: Seven appearances in UEFA Europa League, one appearance in UEFA Europa Conference League)	0	41	9
Fenerbahçe	2022–23	Süper Lig	23	3	5	1	6	1	34	5
Fenerbahçe	2023–24	Süper Lig	11	0	2	0	8 (Note: Appearances in UEFA Europa Conference League)	2	21	2
Fenerbahçe	Total		86	15	15	2	22	3	123	20
Genoa (loan)	2020–21	Serie A	31	1	2	0	—		33	1
Toulouse (loan)	2024–25	Ligue 1	19	0	3	0	—		22	0
Career total			329	48	38	4	26	4	393	56

=== International ===
Appearances and goals by national team and year
National team	Year	Apps	Goals
Slovenia	2016	3	0
Slovenia	2018	8	3
Slovenia	2019	8	2
Slovenia	2020	3	0
Slovenia	2021	7	2
Slovenia	2022	6	1
Slovenia	2023	4	0
Total		39	8

Scores and results list Slovenia's goal tally first, score column indicates score after each Zajc goal.

List of international goals scored by Miha Zajc
No.	Date	Venue	Opponent	Score	Result	Competition
1	2 June 2018	Podgorica City Stadium, Podgorica, Montenegro	Montenegro	2–0	2–0	Friendly
2	6 September 2018	Stožice Stadium, Ljubljana, Slovenia	Bulgaria	1–1	1–2	2018–19 UEFA Nations League C
3	19 November 2018	Vasil Levski National Stadium, Sofia, Bulgaria	Bulgaria	1–1	1–1	2018–19 UEFA Nations League C
4	24 March 2019	Stožice Stadium, Ljubljana, Slovenia	North Macedonia	1–0	1–1	UEFA Euro 2020 qualification
5	10 June 2019	Daugava Stadium, Riga, Latvia	Latvia	5–0	5–0	UEFA Euro 2020 qualification
6	11 November 2021	Anton Malatinský Stadium, Trnava, Slovakia	Slovakia	1–0	2–2	2022 FIFA World Cup qualification
7	14 November 2021	Stožice Stadium, Ljubljana, Slovenia	Cyprus	1–0	2–1	2022 FIFA World Cup qualification
8	20 November 2022	Stožice Stadium, Ljubljana, Slovenia	Montenegro	1–0	1–0	Friendly

== Honours ==
Olimpija Ljubljana

- Slovenian PrvaLiga: 2015–16

Empoli

- Serie B: 2017–18

Fenerbahçe

- Turkish Cup: 2022–23

Dinamo Zagreb

- Croatian Football League: 2025–26
- Croatian Cup: 2025–26
