= NK Varteks (2011) =

Croatian football club

Varteks Varaždin
- Full name: Nogometni klub Varteks Varaždin
- Nicknames: Krojači (The Tailors); Bumbari (The Bumblebees)
- Founded: 29 May 2011; 15 years ago
- Ground: Hrašćica; Stadion Varteks (sometimes)
- Capacity: 550; 8,818
- Chairman: Siniša Fučkar
- Manager: Dražen Besek
- League: 2.NL
- Website: https://www.nk-varteks.com/
Home colours	Away colours

NK Varteks Varaždin is a Croatian professional football club based in the city of Varaždin, founded by supporters of NK Varaždin who were dissatisfied with the name change from NK Varteks to NK Varaždin, club's financial difficulties and failure to make salary payments, which caused players to jump to other teams.

== Season by season overview ==
Season	Competition	Level	Position	Comment
2011/12	Second League of Varaždin County - East	6	3/12	
2012/13	Second League of Varaždin County - East	6	1/12	promoted
2013/14	First League of Varaždin County	5	13/16	
2014/15	First League of Varaždin County	5	4/16	promoted
2015/16	Inter-county League of Varaždin and Čakovec	4	7/16	
2016/17	Inter-county League of Varaždin and Čakovec	4	2/16	promoted
2017/18	Croatian Third Football League - East	3	16/16	relegated
2018/19	Inter-county League of Varaždin and Čakovec	4	2/16	promoted
2019/20	Croatian Third Football League - North	3	5/16	
2020/21	Croatian Third Football League - North	3	8/12	
2021/22	Croatian Third Football League - North	3	9/12	
2022/23	Third Football League - North	4	3/10	
2023/24	Third Football League - North	4	3/16	
2024/25	Third Football League - North			

== Current squad ==
As of 14 March 2025

Note: Flags indicate national team as defined under FIFA eligibility rules; some limited exceptions apply. Players may hold more than one non-FIFA nationality.

No.	Pos.	Nation	Player
1	GK	CRO	Jura Banfić
4	MF	CRO	Fran Kukec
5	DF	CRO	Noa Lukačić
6	DF	CRO	Ivan Ptiček
7	MF	BRA	Eduardo Dos Santos Da Silva
8	MF	CRO	Niko Škrlec
9	FW	CRO	Petar Havojić
10	FW	CRO	Dejan Glavica
11	MF	CRO	Martin Plavec Marković
14	MF	CRO	Roko Hrastić
15	DF	CRO	Marijan Fotak
16	MF	CRO	Nino Možanić
18	MF	ZIM	Romario Matova
19	MF	CRO	Niko Mihalinec
22	GK	CRO	Filip Kirić
23	DF	CRO	Matija Katanec
24	FW	CRO	Matija Kanceljak
30	FW	CRO	Dominik Božak
