= 2025–26 Croatian Football Cup =

SuperSport Hrvatski nogometni kup

Tournament details
- Country: Croatia
- Teams: 48

Final positions
- Champions: Dinamo Zagreb
- Runners-up: Rijeka

Tournament statistics
- Matches played: 47
- Goals scored: 189 (4.02 per match)
- Top goal scorer(s): Monsef Bakrar; Luka Sedlaček (5 each)

The 2025–26 Croatian Football Cup was the 35th season of Croatia's football knockout competition. It was sponsored by the betting company SuperSport and known as the SuperSport Hrvatski nogometni kup for sponsorship purposes. The defending champions were Rijeka, having won their seventh title the previous year by defeating Slaven Belupo in the final.

== Calendar ==
Round	Date(s)	Number of fixtures	Clubs	New entries this round	Financial sponsorship	Goals / games
Preliminary round	27 August 2025	16	48 → 32	32	€1,500 (both teams)	68 / 16
Round of 32	10 September 2025	16	32 → 16	16	€2,000 (home)	65 / 16
Round of 16	29 October 2025	8	16 → 8	none	€2,500 (home)	30 / 8
Quarter-finals	4 March 2026	4	8 → 4	none	€3,000 (home) / €3,000 (guest)	13 / 4
Semi-finals	8 April 2026	2	4 → 2	none	€6,000 (home) / €6,000 (guest)	11 / 2
Final	13 May 2026	1	2 → 1	none	€20,000 (winner) / €10,000 (runner up)	2 / 1

== Participating clubs ==
The following 48 teams qualified for the competition:

Best clubs by cup coefficient 16 clubs	Winners and runners up of county cups 32 clubs
Dinamo Zagreb; Hajduk Split; Rijeka; Slaven Belupo; Istra 1961; Osijek; Gorica; Šibenik; Lokomotiva; Rudeš; Varaždin; Oriolik; BSK Bijelo Brdo; Mladost Ždralovi; Cibalia; Belišće	Osijek-Baranja County cup winner: Radnički Dalj; Osijek-Baranja County cup runner up: Jedinstvo Donji Miholjac; Zagreb County cup winner: Dugo Selo; Zagreb County cup runner up: Kurilovec; Brod-Posavina County cup winner: Marsonia; Brod-Posavina County cup runner up: Zadrugar Oprisavci; Međimurje County cup winner: Graničar Kotoriba; Međimurje County cup runner up: BSK Belica; Vukovar-Srijem County cup winner: Vukovar 1991; Vukovar-Srijem County cup runner up: Bedem Ivankovo; Koprivnica-Križevci County cup winner: Radnik Križevci; Koprivnica-Križevci County cup runner up: Koprivnica; Istria County cup winner: Uljanik Pula; Istria County cup runner up: Jadran Poreč; Sisak-Moslavina County cup winner: Moslavina; Sisak-Moslavina County cup runner up: Libertas Novska; Bjelovar-Bilogora County cup winner: Dinamo Predavac; Bjelovar-Bilogora County cup runner up: Bjelovar; Varaždin County cup winner: Varteks; Varaždin County cup runner up: Bednja Beletinec; City of Zagreb cup winner: Maksimir; City of Zagreb cup runner up: Špansko; Virovitica-Podravina County cup winner: Pitomača; Split-Dalmatia County cup winner: Solin; Primorje-Gorski Kotar County cup winner: Opatija; Požega-Slavonia County cup winner: Slavonija Požega; Zadar County cup winner: Zemunik; Karlovac County cup winner: Karlovac 1919; Dubrovnik-Neretva County cup winner: Neretva; Krapina-Zagorje County cup winner: Gaj Mače; Šibenik-Knin County cup winner: DOŠK Drniš; Lika-Senj County cup winner: Nehaj

== Preliminary round ==
The draw for the preliminary single-legged round was held on 3 July 2025 and the matches were played on 27 August 2025.

Tie no.	Home team	Score	Away team
1	Neretva	6–2	Zadrugar Oprisavci
2	Uljanik Pula	2–0	Bjelovar
3	BSK Belica	1–4	Solin
4	Varteks	3–0	Moslavina
5	Radnik Križevci	5–0	DOŠK Drniš
6	Špansko	0–1	Gaj Mače
7	Zemunik	2–12	Kurilovec
8*	Maksimir	3–2 (a.e.t.)	Jadran Poreč
9	Slavonija Požega	1–0	Marsonia
10	Bednja Beletinec	1–4	Karlovac 1919
11	Jedinstvo Donji Miholjac	0–3	Dugo Selo
12	Bedem Ivankovo	3–5	Dinamo Predavac
13	Radnički Dalj	0–2	Graničar Kotoriba
14	Libertas Novska	1–1 (5–4 p)	Opatija
15*	Nehaj	1–2	Vukovar 1991
16	Koprivnica	1–0	Pitomača

*Matches played on 26 August 2025.

== Round of 32 ==
The draw was determined according to the principle of opposite numbers, which were assigned based on the club coefficient. Matches were played on 10 September 2025.

Tie no.	Home team	Score	Away team
1	Dinamo Predavac	0–6	Dinamo Zagreb
2*****	Koprivnica	1–4	Hajduk Split
3****	Maksimir	0–4	Rijeka
4***	Graničar Kotoriba	0–5	Slaven Belupo
5**	Neretva	1–2	Istra 1961
6*****	Uljanik Pula	0–4	Osijek
7	Libertas Novska	1–3	Gorica
8	Varteks	4–1	Šibenik
9	Dugo Selo	0–4	Lokomotiva
10*	Solin	1–2	Rudeš
11*	Gaj Mače	1–7	Varaždin
12	Kurilovec	5–0	Oriolik
13	Slavonija Požega	0–2	BSK Bijelo Brdo
14	Radnik Križevci	0–1	Mladost Ždralovi
15	Vukovar 1991	0–1	Cibalia
16*	Karlovac 1919	5–0	Belišće

*Matches played on 9 September 2025.

**Match played on 16 September 2025.

***Match played on 17 September 2025.

****Match played on 17 September 2025 in Rijeka.

*****Matches played on 24 September 2025.

== Round of 16 ==
The draw was determined according to the principle of opposite numbers, which were assigned based on the club coefficient. Matches will be played on 29 October 2025.

Tie no.	Home team	Score	Away team
1**	Karlovac 1919	0–7	Dinamo Zagreb
2	Cibalia	0–0 (2–4 p)	Hajduk Split
3***	Mladost Ždralovi	1–4	Rijeka
4	BSK Bijelo Brdo	0–3	Slaven Belupo
5*	Kurilovec	2–1	Istra 1961
6***	Varaždin	1–1 (4–2 p)	Osijek
7	Rudeš	0–6	Gorica
8	Lokomotiva	4–0	Varteks

*Match played on 5 November 2025.

**Match played on 19 November 2025.

***Matches played on 3 December 2025.

== Quarter-finals ==
The draw was held on 8 December 2025. Matches will be played on 4 March 2026.

Tie no.	Home team	Score	Away team
1	Dinamo Zagreb	2–0	Kurilovec
2	Rijeka	3–2	Hajduk Split
3*	Slaven Belupo	1–1 (4–2 p)	Lokomotiva
4	Varaždin	1–3	Gorica

*Match played on 10 March 2026.

== Semi-finals ==
The semi-finals were played on 8 April 2026, while the draw was held on 11 March 2026.

8 April 2026
16:30

Rijeka	2–0	Slaven Belupo
Gojak 71'; Legbo 84'	Report

Stadion Rujevica, Rijeka
Attendance: 5,972
Referee: Igor Pajač (Sveti Ivan Zelina)

8 April 2026
18:30

Gorica	3–6	Dinamo Zagreb
Bogojević 3'; Sule 24'; Kučiš 89'	Report	Bakrar 6'; Zajc 43', 64'; Beljo 58'; Goda 70'; Topić 90+3'

Gradski stadion, Velika Gorica
Attendance: 3,572
Referee: Duje Strukan (Split)

== Final ==
The final was played on 13 May 2026. On 28 April 2025, it was decided that Osijek would host the final at Opus Arena.

13 May 2026
18:00

Dinamo Zagreb	2–0	Rijeka
Stojković 50', 57'	Report

Opus Arena, Osijek
Attendance: 11,055
Referee: Mateo Erceg (Benkovac)

== Top scorers ==
Final ranking of top scorers.

Rank	Player	Club	Goals
1	(Algeria) Monsef Bakrar	Dinamo Zagreb	5
1	(Croatia) Luka Sedlaček	Kurilovec	5
3	(Slovenia) Aleks Stojaković	Lokomotiva	4
3	(Croatia) Luka Stojković	Dinamo Zagreb	4
5	(Croatia) Duje Čop	Rijeka	3
5	(Croatia) Zlatan Koščević	Karlovac 1919	3
5	(Croatia) Sandro Kulenović	Dinamo Zagreb	3
5	(Bosnia and Herzegovina) Antonio Raguž	Neretva Metković	3
5	(Croatia) Matija Kanceljak	Varteks	3
5	(Croatia) Antonio Novak	Kurilovec	3
11	23 players from 16 clubs		2
