= Blagoy Simeonov =

Bulgarian footballer

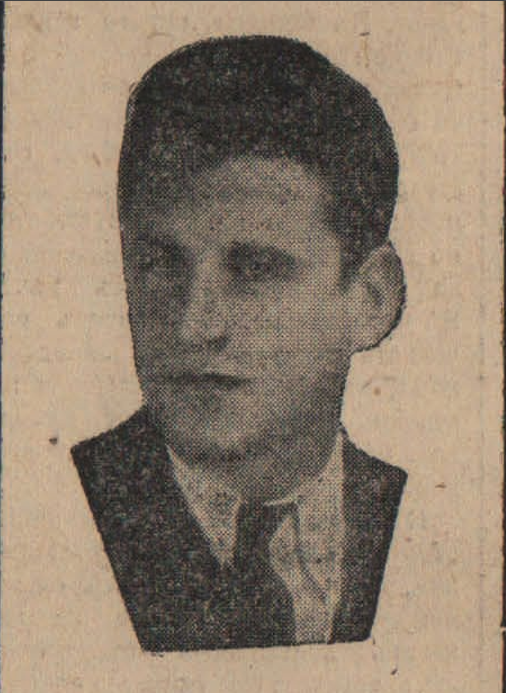

Personal information
- Full name: Blagoy Simeonov
- Date of birth: 1917
- Place of birth: Skopje, Bulgarian occupation zone of Serbia
- Position: Midfielder

Senior career*
Years	Team	Apps	(Gls)
1935–1941	Građanski Skoplje	+24	(1)
1941–1944	Makedonia Skopie		
1946–1947	Metalac	1	(0)

International career
1942	Bulgaria	1	(0)
- * Club domestic league appearances and goals

Blagoy Simeonov (Благој Симеонов) was a Bulgarian international footballer.

== Club career ==
Blagoy Simeonov, known by the name of Blagoje "Blaže" Simonović, was playing along with his brother, Kiril Simonovski (Kiril Simeonov), in Građanski Skoplje in the Kingdom of Yugoslavia. Građanski was the dominant club of the Skoplje Football Subassociation and Simeonov brothers got to play on two occasions with Građanski in the Yugoslav Championship which was the final tournament held each year where the winners of all subassociation leagues played in order to determine the national champion. Građanski Skoplje managed to qualify twice, in 1935–36 and in 1938–39 Yugoslav Football Championship. Both Blagoy and Kiril played on both occasions.

Later in the season 1939–40, the system changed, and Građanski was placed in the 1939–40 Serbian League but since it finished fifth it failed to qualify to the final tournament. Blagoy Simeonov, played alongside his brother in the 1940–41 Serbian League as well. In total, with Građanski, Simeonov made 24 appearances and scored 1 goal in the Yugoslav Championship, plus an unknown number of appearances without scoring in the Serbian League.

The 1940–41 season was interrupted by the arrival of the Second World War and the Axis invasion of Yugoslavia. Skopje, the city Građanski was based in, was the capital of the Vardarska banovina within Yugoslavia, and with the start of the war the entire region was incorporated into Axis-allied Bulgaria. The Bulgarian authorities decided to merge Građanski, SSK SKoplje, ŽSK, Pobeda Skoplje and Jug, the best clubs from Skopje, which they named FC Makedonia. Most of the players of the new club were former Građanski players, including their coach, Hungarian Illés Spitz. They were immediately included in the 1941 Bulgarian State Football Championship. In the first round they faced Sportklub Plovdiv and won 2–1 at home, but due to their inability to travel for the away game, they were attributed a 0–3 defeat and were thereby eliminated. In the 1942 Bulgarian State Football Championship however, they entered much better prepared, and after taking revenge over Plovdiv in a single game won by 2–0, advanced to the quarterfinals where they eliminated favorites ZhsK Sofia by a stunning result of 3–1 and 6–1. The semifinals were played against Slavia Sofia, a team that by then had already been Bulgarian champion five times, and were the title holders. Playing in the Bulgarian capital Sofia where Slavia was playing at home, Makedonia shocked the audience by winning, 5–1. Slavia did its best in the second game, but their 3–0 win was not enough, and Makedonia qualified to the final with a 5–4 aggregate win. The final was played in two games, both in Sofia, against Levski. Both games were lost by Makedonia, the first one on 11 October 1942, by 0–2, and the second on 18 October, by 0–1. The hero and the scorer of all three goals was Bozhin Laskov. The fact that Levski didn't have to play the semifinals may have contributed to their players being fresh, while Makedonia players had come to the finals after playing many games is often mentioned by Makedonia players, stuff and enthusiasts as reason why they didn't take the trophy to Skopje that season.

At the end of the war and the defeat of the Axis powers, Kiril and Blagoy returned to Yugoslavia which abolished the monarchy and retook the territory of the Vardar Banovina which Bulgaria had occupied during the war and turned much of its southern parts into the newly former Socialist Republic of Macedonia, one of the six federal units (socialist republics) forming the newly established SFR Yugoslavia. During the war, Yugoslavia had two factions resisting the Axis invasions, the monarchists and the communists. As the latter won, they disbanded all major pre-war monarchic clubs and formed new ones which were identified by the new communist ideology. As a talented footballer, Blagoy and Kiril were brought to Serbia, and while Kiril joined FK Partizan, Blagoy was signed by OFK Beograd, named temporarily Metalac Beograd at the time. He played with Metalac under the Serbianized name he used in the pre-war period while playing with Graanski in the Yugoslav championship, Blagoje Simonović. He played with Metalac in the 1946–47 and made one appearance in the league.

== International career ==
The Bulgarian Football Union recognised the quality of Makedonia after their play in the 1942 Bulgarian championship, and several of the players were called for Bulgarian national team. Blagoy, as well as his brother Kiril, were among them. Blagoy made one appearances for Bulgarian national team, in Sofia, on 19 July 1942, against Nazi Germany.
