= Todor Atanaskov =

Macedonian footballer

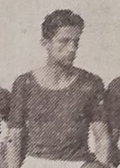

Personal information
- Full name: Svetozar Atanacković
- Date of birth: 17 January 1919 (age 107)
- Place of birth: Skopje, Kingdom of Serbs, Croats and Slovenians
- Position: Forward

Senior career*
Years	Team	Apps	(Gls)
1935–1941	Građanski Skoplje	+26	(23)
1941–1944	Makedonia Skopie		
1946–1948	Red Star Belgrade	6	(1)

International career
1942	Bulgaria	2	(0)
- * Club domestic league appearances and goals

Todor Atanaskov (Bulgarian: Тодор Атанасков) (born 7 January 1919, date of death unknown) was a Bulgarian international footballer.

== Career ==
Atanaskov, also known as Svetozar "Toza" Atanacković, played for Građanski Skoplje in the Kingdom of Yugoslavia. Atanaskov participated twice in the Yugoslav Championship where the winners of all subassociations competed for the national title. Građanski Skoplje qualified twice, in the 1935–36 and 1938–39 Yugoslav Football Championships. Atanaskov played on both occasions, and was the player with the most appearances and goals for Građanski at the Yugoslav highest level.

In the 1939–40, the system changed, and Građanski was placed in the Serbian League. Finishing fifth, they failed to qualify for the final tournament. During the 1940–41 Serbian League, Atanaskov scored eight goals. In total, Atanaskov made 26 appearances and scored 11 goals in the Yugoslav Championship, plus an unknown number of appearances and 12 goals in the Serbian League.

The 1940–41 season was interrupted by the Second World War and Axis invasion of Yugoslavia. Skopje, the city Građanski in which was based, became incorporated into Axis-allied Bulgaria. The new Bulgarian authorities decided to merge several of the best clubs from Skopje, including Građanski, SSK Skoplje, ŽSK, Pobeda Skoplje and Jug, into one club named FC Makedonia. Most of the players of the new club were former Građanski players, including their coach, Hungarian Illés Spitz. FC Makedonia participated in the 1941 Bulgarian State Football Championship but were eliminated the away game in fault of travel restrictions. In the 1942 Bulgarian State Football Championship, they performed better, eliminating ZhsK Sofia and reaching the finals after defeating Slavia Sofia. In the final, they lost both games to Levski.

=== International ===
Following their performance in the 1942 Championship, several FC Makedonia players were called up to the Bulgarian Football Union, including Atanaskov. He made two appearances for the Bulgarian national team, the first one on 11 April 1942, against Croatia in Zagreb, and the second one on 19 July 1942, against Nazi Germany in Sofia.

After the end of World War II and the re-establishment of Yugoslavia, Atanaskov returned to the newly formed Socialist Republic of Macedonia within Yugoslavia. The communist authorities disbanded pre-war monarchist clubs and formed new ones aligned with the communist ideology. Astanaskov was brought to Belgrade and played for the newly formed Red Star Belgrade under the Serbianised name he used before the war, Svetozar Atanacković. He played with Red Star in the 1946–47 and 1947–48 Yugoslav First League.
