= Football in Skopje =

Football is the most popular sport, both in terms of participants and spectators, in Skopje. Skopje has several of North Macedonia's significant football clubs.

== Introduction ==
FK Vardar is Skopje's most successful club. Other notable clubs are Rabotnički and Shkupi.

Toše Proeski Arena, country's biggest stadium and FK Rabotnički's home ground is located in the centre of the city. It is also the home venue of the North Macedonia national football team.

== History ==
The beginnings of football in Skopje date back to the early 20th century. The first match was played on April 20, 1909. It was the selection of the English army composed of the best players among the recruits, against Napredok of Skopje, Napredok won the match by the score of 2-0. At that place in sign of remembrance of the first soccer match played on the territory of Macedonia, a monument in the form of a soccer ball weighing about 250 pounds was erected. The monument was erected in 1979, to mark the anniversary of 70 years since the start of football in Macedonia.

After 1909 many clubs have been formed, notably Gragjanski Skopje, Pobeda Skopje and SSK Skopje. Since 1920 the clubs from Skopje had competed in the Yugoslav league system. First they were part of the Belgrade Football Subassociation (1920–1927), and later, in 1927, a separate Skoplje Football Subassociation was formed. The creation of the later made it considerably easier for Macedonian clubs to access Yugoslav First League and Gragjanski Skopje became usual participant during the late 1930s in the Yugoslav top tier. After the World War II two Skopje clubs, Pobeda and Makedonija, merged to form FK Vardar. Vardar became the most successful Macedonian football club, winning the Yugoslav First League in 1987.

== Clubs ==
The table below lists all Skopje clubs.

- Active

Club	Founded
Cementarnica 55	1955
Gorno Lisiče	1964
Lokomotiva	1954
Madžari Solidarnost	1992
Makedonija GP	1932
Metalurg	1964
Rabotnički	1937
Shkupi*	2012
Skopje	1960
Vardar	1947

- Defunct

Club	Years
Balkan	1921-2012
Gragjanski	1922-1947
Jug	1920-1945
Pobeda	1921-1947
Sloga*	1927-2009
SSK Skopje	1921-1945

Clubs marked with * are unofficial successors of defunct clubs.

== Honours ==
- Macedonian Football Champions (18)
  - Vardar (10)
  - Rabotnički (4)
  - Sloga (3)
  - Makedonija GP (1)
- Yugoslav Football Champions (1)
  - Vardar (1)*
- Macedonian Cup (15)
  - Vardar (5)
  - Rabotnički (4)
  - Sloga (3)
  - Cementarnica 55 (1)
  - Makedonija GP (1)
  - Metalurg (1)
- Yugoslav Cup (1)
  - Vardar (1)
- Macedonian Supercup (2)
  - Vardar (2)

== Skopje derbies ==
There are two major Skopje derbies. First ist between Vardar and Shkupi, and the second is between Vardar and Rabotnički. The Vardar-Shkupi rivalry is drawn along ethnic lines as Vardar fans are Macedonians and Orthodox Christians, while FK Shkupi fans are Albanians.

== Stadiums ==
- Philip II Arena
- Boris Trajkovski Stadium
- Cementarnica Stadium
- Meadow Stadium
- Gjorče Petrov Stadium
- Komunalec Stadium
- Železarnica Stadium

== See also ==
- Football in North Macedonia
