= Macedonian First Football League =

Macedonian First Football League Прва македонска фудбалска лига
- Founded: 1927; 99 years ago
- First season: 1992–93
- Country: North Macedonia
- Confederation: UEFA
- Number of clubs: 10
- Level on pyramid: 1
- Relegation to: 2. MFL
- Domestic cup: Macedonian Football Cup
- International cup(s): UEFA Champions League; UEFA Conference League
- Current champions: Vardar (12th title) (2025–26)
- Most championships: Vardar (12 titles)
- Top scorer: Besart Ibraimi (189 goals)
- Broadcaster: Arena Sport (MKD)
- Website: ffm.mk
- Current: 2026–27 Macedonian First Football League

The Macedonian First Football League (Macedonian: Прва македонска фудбалска лига), also called Macedonian First League, 1. MFL, and Prva Liga, is the highest professional football competition in North Macedonia. It is a professional league competition for football clubs located at the top of the Macedonian football league system and has been operating since the 1992–93 season. It is organized by the Football Federation of Macedonia.

== Format ==
Macedonian First League's former logo

Throughout the 1. MFL history, the number of clubs competing at the top level has been gradually decreased until the 2020–21 season. Below is a complete record of how many teams played in each season throughout the league's history:

- 18 clubs = 1992–1993
- 16 clubs = 1993–1995
- 15 clubs = 1995–1996
- 14 clubs = 1996–2001
- 12 clubs = 2001–2014
- 10 clubs = 2014–2020
- 12 clubs = 2020–2026
- 10 clubs = 2026–

The league has 12 teams, and each team plays the other sides three times, for a total of 33 matches each.

Due to the UEFA ranking coefficients ranking (shown below), the winners of the league enter the 1st qualifying round of the Champions League, while the second and third placed teams enter the 1st qualifying round of the UEFA Europa Conference League alongside the winner of the Macedonian Football Cup. At the end of the season, the bottom 2 teams are relegated to the Macedonian Second League while the eighth placed team enter a play-off with the winner of the tie between second placed teams of the two groups in the Macedonian Second League.

=== UEFA rankings ===
UEFA country ranking for league participation in 2026–27 European football season (Previous year rank in italics)

- 49 (52) (Wales) Cymru Premier
- 50 (46) (Georgia (country)) Erovnuli Liga
- 51 (50) (North Macedonia) Macedonian First League
- 52 (49) (Belarus) Belarusian Premier League
- 53 (51) (Andorra) Primera Divisió

== Current teams (2026–27) ==
Location of teams in 2026–27 Macedonian First League

Club	Position in 2025–26
Arsimi	6th
Bashkimi	7th
Bregalnica Štip	1st in 2. MFL
Sileks	4th
Shkëndija	2nd
Shkëndija Haraçinë 77	3rd in 2. MFL
Skopje	2nd in 2. MFL
Struga	3rd
Tikvesh	5th
Vardar	1st

== History ==
In 1923, the first national Yugoslav Football Championship was held, and regional championships were also played. The clubs of the Vardar Banovina, territorially similar to present day Macedonia, played within the Belgrade Football Subassociation league until 1927, when a separate Skoplje Football Subassociation league was formed. The champions of the subassociation leagues were granted a place in the qualifiers to the Yugoslav Championship. Gragjanski Skopje became the only Macedonian club to participate in the national league, first in 1935–36 when the championship was played in a cup format, and then in 1938–39, when it was played in a normal league system with Gragjanski finishing 10th out of 12 teams. In 1939, the Yugoslav league system was changed, with the creation of separate Serbian and Croato-Slovenian leagues which served as qualifying leagues for the final phase of the Yugoslav Championship. The clubs from the Skopje Subassociation aimed to qualify to the Serbian League, however only Gragjanski managed to participate, in 1939–40 (5th place) and 1940–41 (8th place).

== Most titles ==
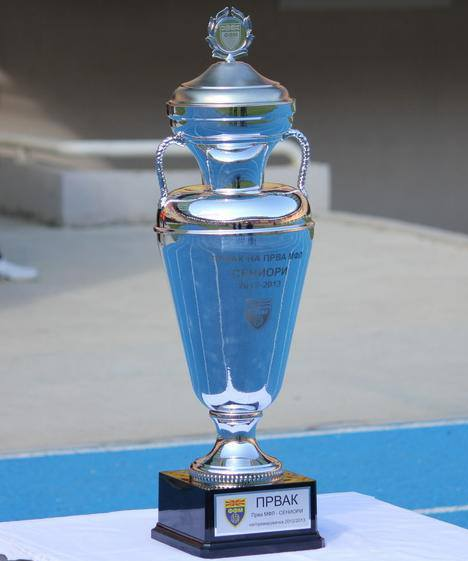
Macedonian First League Trophy

The titles won by clubs since independence are shown in the following table:

Club	Titles	Runners-up	Winning years
Vardar Skopje	12	2	1992–93, 1993–94, 1994–95, 2001–02, 2002–03, 2011–12, 2012–13, 2014–15, 2015–16, 2016–17, 2019–20, 2025–26
Shkendija	5	4	2010–11, 2017–18, 2018–19, 2020–21, 2024–25
Rabotnički Skopje	4	3	2004–05, 2005–06, 2007–08, 2013–14
Sileks Kratovo	3	6	1995–96, 1996–97, 1997–98
Sloga J.	3	4	1998–99, 1999–2000, 2000–01
Pobeda Prilep	2	2	2003–04, 2006–07
Struga	2	0	2022–23, 2023–24
Makedonija Gjorce Petrov	1	1	2008–09
Renova Djepchishte	1	0	2009–10
Shkupi	1	0	2021–22
Metalurg Skopje	-	3	
Milano Kumanovo	-	2	
Belasica Strumica	-	2	
