= Football in North Macedonia =

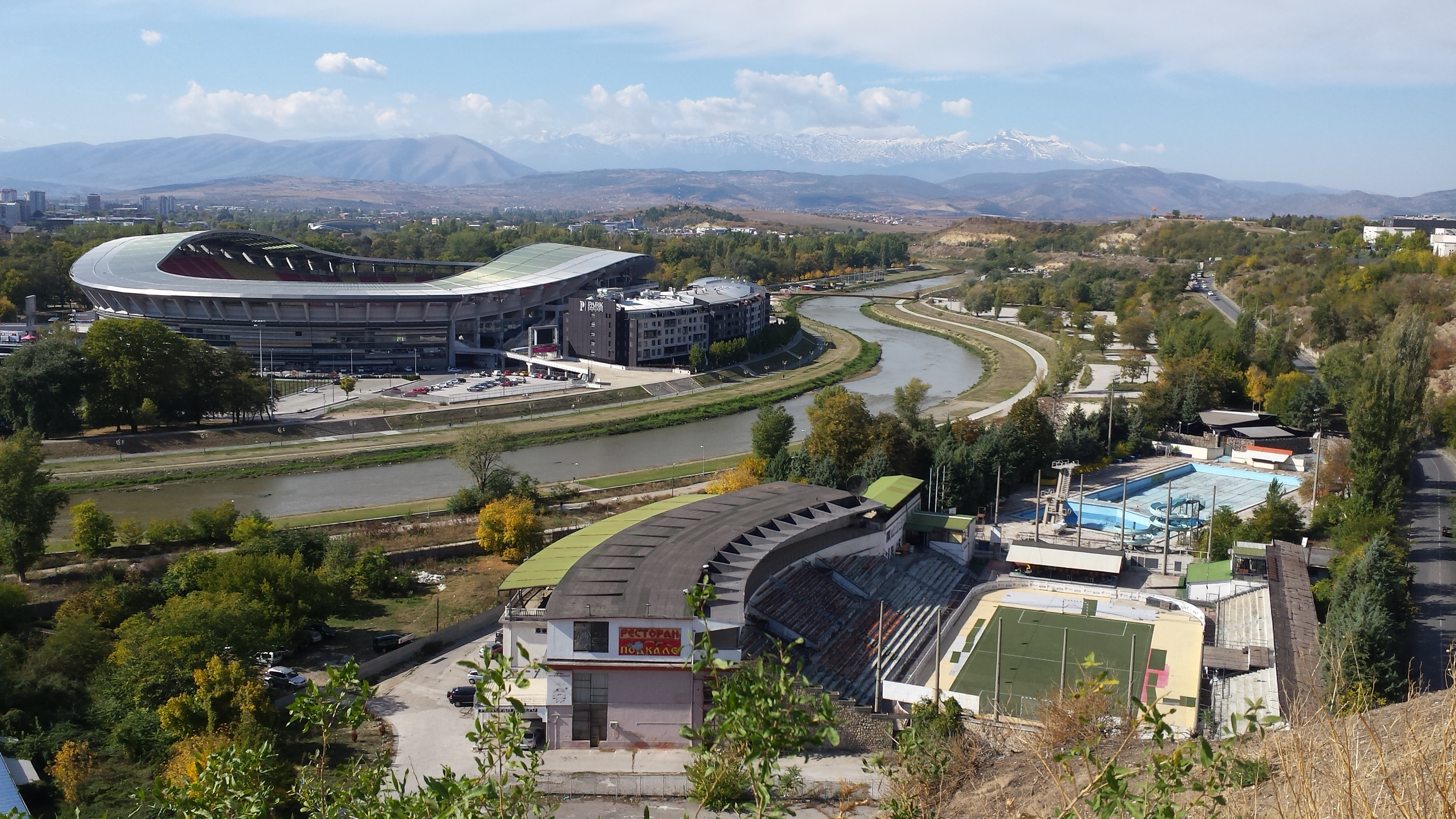
- The Toše Proeski Arena in Skopje is the home of the North Macedonia national football team
- Country: North Macedonia
- Governing body: Football Federation of North Macedonia
- National team: North Macedonia
- First played: 1909; 117 years ago

National competitions
- FIFA World Cup; UEFA European Championship; UEFA Nations League

Club competitions
- List: League; 1. MFL; 2. MFL; 3. MFL; 4. MFL Cups: Macedonian Football Cup Macedonian Super Cup

International competitions
- FIFA Club World Cup; UEFA Champions League; UEFA Europa League; UEFA Europa Conference League; UEFA Super Cup

Football is the most popular sport in North Macedonia. The country became a member of FIFA in 1994.

The national team has made a few remarkable results in qualifiers for the European Championship as well as the World Cup.

== Format ==
The governing body of football in North Macedonia is the Football Federation of North Macedonia. It oversees the organization of:

- Leagues:
  - Macedonian First Football League
  - Macedonian Second Football League
  - Macedonian Third Football League
  - Macedonian Municipal Football Leagues
- Cup tournaments:
  - Macedonian Football Cup
  - Macedonian Football Super Cup
- National teams:
  - North Macedonia national football team
  - North Macedonia national under-21 football team
  - North Macedonia national under-19 football team
  - North Macedonia national under-17 football team
  - North Macedonia women's national football team

Note: the aforementioned competitions are for men if not stated differently. Women's football exists but is much less developed or popular.

== Teams ==
By far the most popular clubs in the country are Vardar (Skopje), Rabotnichki (Skopje), Shkëndija (Tetovo), Pelister (Bitola) and Pobeda (Prilep).

== History ==
The beginnings of football in North Macedonia date back to the early 20th century in the then Ottoman Empire, with the first recorded match taking place in Skopje in April 1909. At that place was erected a monument in the form of soccer ball weighing about 250 pounds, because it was the first official soccer match played on the territory of North Macedonia. The monument was erected here in 1979.

After the First World War, the region had become part of the Kingdom of Serbs, Croats and Slovenes (renamed to Yugoslavia in 1929). A match was played in Skopje on April 20, 1919. It was the selection of the English army composed of the best players among the recruits, against Napredok of Skopje, Napredok would win the match by the score of 2-0. Since 1920, the clubs from the current territory of the Republic of North Macedonia had competed in the Yugoslav league system. First they were part of the Belgrade Football Subassociation (1920–1927), and later, in 1927, a separate Skoplje Football Subassociation was formed. The creation of the later made it considerably easier for Macedonian clubs to access Yugoslav First League since the subassociation leagues functioned as qualifying leagues for the Yugoslav national championship and they avoided the clubs from Belgrade. Gragjanski Skopje became usual participant during the late 1930s in the Yugoslav top tier. By the late 1930s and early 1940s the league system was changed, and Macedonian clubs competed within the Serbian league.

In 1941, as a result of the Second World War, most of Vardar Macedonia was administered by the Kingdom of Bulgaria. The football clubs and leagues were restructured and incorporated into the Bulgarian league system. From 1941 until 1944, the strongest clubs from the region competed in the Bulgarian Championship. During that time, the selection of Macedonian clubs played against the selection of the German army, and played matches against Bulgaria. During this period, several players from Vardar Macedonia represented the Bulgaria national team.

In 1945, at the end of the Second World War, the region was reincorporated into Yugoslavia, and SR Macedonia was established as one of the 6 constituent socialist republics of SFR Yugoslavia. The best Macedonian clubs usually competed in the Federal leagues, First and Second Yugoslav leagues, while the Macedonian Republic League was formed to serve as qualifying league for the federal ones. In 1945, after the Second World War, a section of the Association of Sports in Skopje with Gustav Vlahov as president, was created. On 14 August 1949, the Macedonian Football Association was formed and was part of the Football Association of Yugoslavia until 1991, when North Macedonia declared independence. The first president of the Football Federation of Macedonia was Ljubisav Ivanov - Dzingo.

In 1991, North Macedonia became an independent sovereign nation as the Republic of Macedonia which would change to the Republic of North Macedonia in 2019. Macedonian clubs abandoned the Yugoslav football league system and created their own league system. The first championship in North Macedonia was organized in the season 1992/93, in which 18 teams participated. Vardar from Skopje was the first champion without a lost match. They would also win the first ever Macedonian Cup. In 1994, North Macedonia became a member of FIFA and UEFA after the break-up of SFR Yugoslavia. In 1995, for the first time Macedonian clubs participated in European Cup matches. As champions, FK Vardar played in the UEFA Cup against Hungarian side Békéscsaba and lost 1–2 on aggregate. FK Sileks played in the UEFA Cup Winners' Cup, eliminating Vác Samsung in the first qualifying round before losing to Borussia Mönchengladbach in the next round.

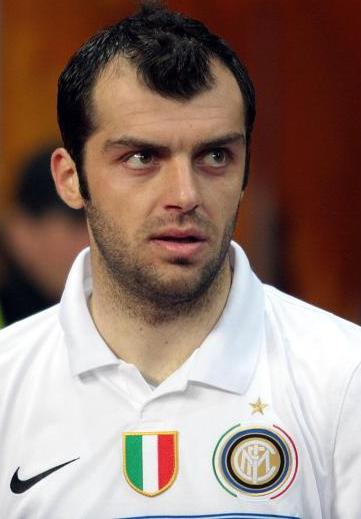
Goran Pandev is a five-time Macedonian player of the year who has spent most of his career in Italy

The national team began its football journey with a 4–1 win against Slovenia in a friendly on 13 October 1993 under coach Andon Dončevski. They went on to win their next two friendlies against Slovenia and Estonia before suffering their first loss against Turkey on 31 August 1994 (before this they lost to Club Atlético Peñarol 0–4 in Montevideo in February 1994). The inaugural North Macedonia side featured Darko Pančev, who won the European Champions League with Red Star Belgrade in 1991 and also played for Internazionale in Italy. The Euro 96 Qualifiers was the first major qualifying tournament that North Macedonia participated in as an independent nation and they were grouped with Spain, Denmark, Belgium, Cyprus, and Armenia. In their opening game, which was also their first ever official match, North Macedonia was drawn against the reigning European Champions Denmark. The game was played at the City Stadium in Skopje on 7 September 1994 and it finished 1–1 (the first goal was scored by Mitko Stojkovski) with North Macedonia leading for most of the game after scoring in the fourth minute. Since then, North Macedonia has been participating in all FIFA and UEFA sanctioned qualifying tournaments.

In 2016, the national U-21 team qualified for the final tournament of 2017 UEFA European Under-21 Championship after finishing first in qualification group 3 behind France, Iceland, Ukraine, Scotland and Northern Ireland. That was the first time that the any national football team of North Macedonia qualified for a major tournament. In 2017, North Macedonia's capital Skopje hosted the 2017 UEFA Super Cup between Real Madrid and Manchester United. Also, in that year, Vardar advanced to the group stage of the UEFA Europa League, after winning over two matches against Turkish giants Fenerbahçe in the play-off round, marking the first time that any Macedonian club qualified for the group stage of any European competition.

== Euro 2020 ==
Euro 2020 marked the first major tournament that North Macedonia ever qualified for. To qualify, they won their Nation’s League group, League D, which qualified them for playoff path D. In this playoff, they beat Kosovo 2-1 and Georgia 1-0 to advance to Euro 2020. Their tournament started with a 3-1 loss to Austria, where Goran Pandev scored the nation’s first ever major tournament goal with a 28th-minute equalizer. In their second game they lost 2-1 to Ukraine with a goal from Ezgjan Alioski. They finished their tournament with a 3-0 loss to one of the host nations for the 2020 Euros, Netherlands. Despite losing all three of their games, just qualifying for the 2020 Euros is the biggest success in the history of North Macedonian football.

== League system ==
As of the 2024/25 season. Leagues that have not been held in successive seasons have been marked as inactive.

Level	League(s)/Division(s)				
1	1. MFL; 12 clubs‐> 10 clubs in 2026-27				
2	2. MFL; 16 clubs				
3	3. MFL North; 14 clubs	3. MFL South; 11 clubs	3. MFL East; 9 clubs	3. MFL West; 8 clubs	3. MFL Southwest; 9 clubs
4	4. MFL; North Groups: 4.MFL Skopje; 4.MFL Kisela Voda; 4.MFL Gazi Baba; 4.MFL Kumanovo; 4.MFL Lipkovo; 4.MFL^{1} Kratovo (inactive)	4. MFL; South Groups: 4.MFL Prilep; 4.MFL Veles; 4.MFL Kavadarci; 4.MFL Negotino	4. MFL; East Groups: 4.MFL Kochani; 4.MFL Valandovo; 4.MFL Probishtip; 4.MFL Gevgelija; 4.MFL Vinica (inactive); 4.MFL Shtip (inactive); 4.MFL Sveti Nikole (inactive); 4.MFL Strumica (inactive); 4.MFL Radovish (inactive)	4. MFL; West Groups: 4.MFL Tetovo; 4.MFL Kichevo; 4.MFL Gostivar	4. MFL; Southwest Groups: 4.MFL Bitola; 4.MFL Ohrid; 4.MFL Struga; 4.MFL Resen (inactive); 4.MFL Demir Hisar (inactive); 4.MFL Makedonski Brod (inactive)
5	5.MFL; Only Bitola, Kumanovo and Prilep host 5.MFL Leagues.				

^{1} Teams from Kratovo and Kriva Palanka usually get grouped together.

== Men's Competition Format and Qualification ==
=== 1. MFL ===
Beginning in the 2026-27 season, the 1. MFL will be reduced to ten clubs. The league champions qualify for the first qualifying round of the UEFA Champions League, while the runners-up qualify for the first qualifying round of the UEFA Europa League.

Prior to the 2026-27 season, teams in 10th-12th place were relegated to the 2. MFL. Clubs finishing in 8th and 9th place competed in a relegation play-off.

Video assistant referee (VAR) technology is planned to be introduced starting in the 2025-26 season.

Match times are provisional and are typically confirmed two to three days before kick-off.

=== 2. MFL ===
The Men's Second League (2. MFL) is the second tier of men's football. The league champions are directly promoted to the 1. MFL. Clubs placing in 2nd & 3rd compete in a playoff for promotion.

Clubs in 12th-16th are relegated, while clubs 9th-11th are placed in a play-out to avoid relegation.

== Macedonian Football Cup and Super Cup ==
=== Macedonian Football Cup ===
The Macedonian Football Cup is the national knockout tournament in North Macedonia. The cup was founded in 1992, slightly after the country's independence. There are 32 teams registered into the tournament. The cup winner qualifies for the UEFA Champions League. The cup runs alongside the league season, with rounds spread throughout it. For example, the 33rd season of North Macedonia's Football competition started on Sept. 18, 2024 and ended on May 21, 2025. Vardar currently have the most titles (6).

=== Macedonian Football Super Cup ===
The Macedonian Football Super Cup was a one-match competition that featured the champions of the 1. MFL and the Macedonian Cup winners. The first Super Cup was held in 2011. It was abolished in 2015 after only being played three times: in 2011, 2013, and 2015. Vardar (Skopje) are the most successful club in the Super Cup winning it twice.

== Women's League System (2025-2026) ==
Level	League(s)/Division(s)
1	1. WFL; (ZFK Atletiko withdrew from competition in 2025 and was replaced by Vardar): Skopje 2014 W; Ljuboten W; Tiverija Brera W; Istatov W; As United W; Kamenica Sas W; Rečica W; Vardar W; Top Gol W; Kochani W
2	2. WFL; Konzuli W; Poreche W; Biljanini Izvori W; Sloboden W; Plachkovica W; Borec W

== Women's Competition Format and Qualification ==
=== 1.WFL (First Division) ===
The Women's First League (1. WFL) is the top tier of women's football in North Macedonia. The league champion qualifies for the UEFA Women's Champions League. The clubs finishing in 9th and 10th place are relegated to the Women's Second League (2. WFL).

Match times are provisional and are generally confirmed two or three days prior to kick-off.

=== 2. WFL (Second Division) ===
The Women's Second League (2. WFL) is the second tier of women's football. The division champion earns promotion to the Women's First League (1. WFL).

=== Domestic Competition ===
Clubs in both divisions compete in the Macedonian Women's Cup, the women's domestic football tournament.

== Attendances ==
The average attendance per top-flight football league season and the club with the highest average attendance:

Season	League average	Best club	Best club average
2018-19	756	Shkëndija	2,711
2017-18	992	Shkëndija	3,572
2016-17	1,407	Shkëndija	4,367
2015-16	813	Shkëndija	2,312
2014-15	1,011	Shkëndija	3,835
2013-14	1,297	Shkëndija	5,513
2012-13	1,156	Shkëndija	3,471
2011-12	1,387	Shkëndija	4,512
2010-11	1,334	Shkëndija	6,206
