= Milorad Nikolić =

Serbian footballer and manager (1958–2022)

Personal information
- Date of birth: 23 July 1920
- Place of birth: Belgrade, Kingdom of Serbs, Croats, and Slovenes
- Date of death: 12 September 2006 (aged 86)
- Place of death: United States
- Position: Midfielder

Youth career
- Sloga Beograd
- 1935–1938: BSK

Senior career*
Years	Team	Apps	(Gls)
1938–1940	BSK	22	(7)
1945–1951	Lausanne-Sport		

International career
1940–1941	Yugoslavia	3	(0)
- * Club domestic league appearances and goals

Milorad Nikolić (Serbian Cyrillic: Милорад Николић; 23 July 1920 – 12 September 2006) was a Serbian footballer.

== Biography ==
Born in Belgrade, Kingdom of Serbs, Croats, and Slovenes, he is remembered as one of the most talented young players that played in the Yugoslav First League before World War II. Playing as a left winger, he was extremely appreciated for his speed and strong shot.

He started playing with SK Sloga Beograd and in 1935 he moved to BSK where he played initially with the youth squad. It was in the season 1938–39 when his club won the national championship, that he made his first occasional appearances in the senior squad. In the next season, he was already a usual starter, playing along many other Yugoslav legends such as Mrkušić, Stojiljković, Dubac, Manola, Dragićević, Lechner, Glišović, Valjarević, Božović and Vujadinović, all of them were also his colleagues at the Yugoslavia national team. Because of the war, his career was interrupted and in June 1944 he emigrated to Switzerland, where he played for Lausanne-Sport. He got married there and would later emigrate to the United States, where he remained for the rest of his life.

Nikolić played a total of three matches for Yugoslavia, two in 1940 and one in 1941, in the last match of the royal Yugoslav team.
