= Svetozar Popović =

Footballer (1902–1985)

Personal information
- Date of birth: 6 February 1902
- Place of birth: Kragujevac, Kingdom of Serbia
- Date of death: 26 October 1985 (aged 83)
- Place of death: Belgrade, SFR Yugoslavia
- Position: Defender

Senior career*
Years	Team	Apps	(Gls)
1918–1919	Soko Pro Roma		
1919–1925	BSK Belgrade		
1925–1927	Juventus București		
1927–1929	Venus București		

International career
1925	Romania	1	(0)

Managerial career
- 1937–1938: Yugoslavia
- 1939: Yugoslavia
- 1940–1941: Yugoslavia
- 1941: BSK Belgrade
- * Club domestic league appearances and goals

Svetozar Kika Popović (Serbian Cyrillic: Светозар Поповић; 6 February 1902 – 26 October 1985) was a Yugoslavia and Romania national football player and coach.

== Biography ==
He began his playing career while being a refugee in Rome, Italy, while the Kingdom of Serbia was fighting World War I. At the end of the war, he returned to Serbia and played with BSK Belgrade until 1925. Then, as an employee of the Commercial Bank Italia, he moved to Bucharest, Romania. While still a bank employee, he continued to play football by playing with Juventus Bucharest and Venus Bucharest. On 1 May 1925, he played one match for the Romania national team as Svetozar Popovici, against Turkey.

After retiring, he became a coach. He coached BSK Belgrade in their 1940 Mitropa Cup campaign. He coached on three occasions the Kingdom of Yugoslavia national football team between 1937 and 1941. He was technical director of BSK Belgrade and later worked in the direction of Red Star Belgrade, where he was one of the founders of the club.

== Honours ==
BSK Belgrade

- Serbian Championship: 1919–20, 1920–21

Venus București

- Romanian Championship: 1928–29
