= List of Bulgaria international footballers born outside Bulgaria =

This is a list of foreign players who have played international football for the Bulgaria national football team.

The following players:

1. have played at least one game for the full Bulgaria international team.
2. have not been born inside Bulgaria and qualify through the FIFA grand parent rules

== Key ==
*	Current internationals.
Caps	Appearances
Pos	Positions
GK	Goalkeeper
DF	Defender
MF	Midfielder
FW	Forward

== List of players ==
As of 6 April 2026

Place of birth	Player	Pos	Caps	Goals	First cap	Last cap	Notes
Russian Empire (Grunau, Tavrida)	Friedrich Klüdt	MF	1	0	1927	1927	
Austria-Hungary (Újpest) (now Hungary)	Karel Burkert	GK	1	0	1934	1934	
Kingdom of Serbia (Skopje) (now North Macedonia)	Kiril Simonovski	DF	1	0	1942	1942	
Kingdom of Serbia (Skopje) (now North Macedonia)	Blagoy Simeonov	DF	1	0	1942	1942	
Kingdom of Serbia (Skopje) (now North Macedonia)	Todor Atanaskov	FW	2	0	1942	1942	
Greece (Sidirokastro)	Georgi Vasilev	FW	17	4	1968	1973	
SFR Yugoslavia (Belgrade) (now Serbia)	Dragoljub Simonović	MF	1	0	1998	1998	
SFR Yugoslavia (Novi Sad) (now Serbia)	Zlatomir Zagorčić	DF	23	0	1998	2004	
SFR Yugoslavia (Nevesinje) (now Bosnia and Herzegovina)	Predrag Pažin	DF	31	0	2000	2004	
SFR Yugoslavia (Inđija) (now Serbia)	Zoran Janković	FW	30	2	2002	2007	
Brazil (Taquari)	Tiago Silva	MF	1	0	2005	2005	
SFR Yugoslavia (Kutina) (now Croatia)	Igor Tomašić	DF	18	0	2006	2009	
Brazil (Rio de Janeiro)	Lúcio Wagner	DF	15	0	2006	2008	
Brazil (Campinas)	Marquinhos	MF	6	0	2011	2014	
SFR Yugoslavia (Belgrade) (now Serbia)	Ivan Čvorović	GK	1	0	2012	2014	
Brazil (Manacapuru)	Marcelinho	MF	11	2	2016	2019	
Brazil (Coronel Sapucaia)	Wanderson	MF	6	0	2019	2019	
Canada (Toronto, Ontario)	Dominik Yankov	MF	18	0	2020	2026*	Parents from Bulgaria.
Brazil (Belém)	Cicinho	DF	7	0	2020	2021	
Portugal (Funchal)	Ilian Iliev Jr.	MF	21	0	2021	2025*	Parents from Bulgaria.
Germany (Rostock)	Edisson Jordanov	MF	5	0	2021	2022	Father from Bulgaria.
Spain (Zaragoza)	Patrik-Gabriel Galchev	DF	6	0	2023	2024*	Parents from Bulgaria.
France (Limoges)	Simeon Petrov	DF	12	0	2023	2025*	Parents from Bulgaria.
Germany (Friedberg)	Lukas Petkov	MF	8	0	2023	2025*	Father from Bulgaria.
Belgium (Turnhout)	Aleksandar Kolev	FW	15	2	2023	2025*	Parents from Bulgaria.
Germany (Hamburg)	Fabian Nürnberger	MF	10	0	2024	2025*	Mother from Bulgaria.

=== By country of birth ===
Country	Total
Brazil	6
Yugoslavia	6
Serbia	3
Germany	3
Austria-Hungary	1
Canada	1
Greece	1
France	1
Portugal	1
Russia	1
Spain	1
Belgium	1

== See also ==
- Bulgaria national football team
