= Dušan Marković =

Dušan Marković may refer to:

- Dušan Marković (footballer, born 1906)
- Dušan Marković (footballer, born 1998)
- Dušan Marković (water polo)
