= 1921–22 Serbian Football Championship =

The Serbian Football Championship season of 1921–22 was the third championship organised by the Belgrade Football Subassociation. Played among the clubs from the territory of the cities of Belgrade and Novi Sad, the league served as inspiration and test for the Yugoslav Football Championship that would be created in 1923.

== First League (1. Razred) ==
Pos	Team	Pld	W	D	L	GF	GA	GD	Pts
1	BSK Belgrade	10	8	1	1	35	11	+24	17
2	Vardar Belgrade	10	7	1	2	31	15	+16	15
3	SK Jugoslavija	10	6	2	2	30	12	+18	14
4	Konkordija Belgrade	10	3	3	4	14	26	−12	9
5	Slavija Belgrade	10	2	0	8	14	41	−27	4
6	Soko Belgrade	10	0	1	9	14	33	−19	1
7	BUSK Belgrade	0	0	0	0	0	0	0	0 (Note: disbanded during the season)

Source: rsssf.org
