= István Mészáros (footballer, born 1899) =

Hungarian footballer and manager (1899–1944)

Personal information
- Date of birth: 4 February 1899
- Place of birth: Szombathely, Austria-Hungary
- Date of death: 28 August 1944 (aged 45)
- Place of death: Ungvár, Hungary
- Position: Forward

Senior career*
| Years | Team | Apps | (Gls) |
| 1925–1926 | Törekvés | 1 | (0) |
| 1926–1929 | Sabaria | 48 | (18) |
| 1929–1930 | Újpest | 7 | (2) |

International career
| 1926–1927 | Hungary | 3 | (1) |

Managerial career
- 1934–1936: Pistoiese
- 1936–1937: Sampierdarenese
- 1939: BSK Belgrade
- 1939–1940: Újpest
- 1940–1941: BSK Belgrade
- 1941: Salgótarjáni BTC
- 1941–1942: Újvidéki AC
- 1942–1943: Szombathelyi
- 1943–1944: Újvidéki AC
- * Club domestic league appearances and goals

István "Erwin" Mészáros (4 February 1899 – 28 August 1944) was a Hungarian international footballer and, later, manager.

== Club career ==
Born in Szombathely, he was a forward and he played most at a club from his birth-town, Sabaria FC. He also played one season with Törekvés SE beforejoning Sabaria, and then after leaving Sabariiia he had a successful spell at Újpest by being part of the squad at their season when they won their first ever Hungarian championship.

== International career ==
He played 3 matches for the Hungarian national team, one in 1926 against Austria (a 3-2 win), and two in 1927, against Czechoslovakia (a 4-1 defeat) and Yugoslavia (a 5-1 defeat). He scored the only Hungarian goal in the match versus Czechoslovakia.

== Coaching career ==
After retiring from playing, he became a manager. He coached in Italy between 1934 and 1937. First he coached Pistoiese in the 1934–35 Serie B finish remarkably well in third place of the Girone B at the end of the season. However, in the 1935–36 Serie B Mészáros´s Pistoiese only avoided relegation in the play-off´s, after finishing 12th. Mészáros then left Pistoiese and joined Sampierdarenese which is one of the predecessors of Sampdoria and coached them in the 1936–37 season.

He moved to the Kingdom of Yugoslavia and took charge of BSK Belgrade by mid 1939. BSK made an impressive run in the 1939 Mitropa Cup by reaching the semi-finals of the tournament that year. His countryman Sándor Nemes coached BSK in their quarter-finals win over Slavia Prague, and then Mészáros took BSK and lead them in the semi-final matches against Újpest. After that, he returned to his native Hungary and, coincidentally, took charge of Újpest FC finishing in third place in the 1939–40 Hungarian championship only one point behind champions Ferencvárosi TC. Then he returned to Yugoslavia, to BSK, and coached them in the 1940–41 Serbian League. They won the league, however because of the beginning of World War II, the final stage of the Yugoslav championship was not held.

In 1941, with World War II already in its peak, he left Yugoslav capital Belgrade and for a short period he coached Hungarian side Salgótarjáni BTC, however still during 1941 he would return to Yugoslavia, although to Novi Sad, now under Hungarian occupation, to coach NAK Novi Sad, which was now known in its Hungarian name as Újvidéki AC and was included in the Hungarian league system. He would stay with Újvidéki AC until 1944, when Hungarian forces abandoned the city. He also coached Szombathelyi around 1943.

He died on 28 August 1944, in Uzhhorod, nowadays Ukraine, but back then known as Ungvár, while still part of Hungary. He was also known as Erwin Meszaros.

== Honours ==
As player:

Újpest

- Nemzeti Bajnokság I: 1929–30

As coach:

BSK Belgrade

- Serbian League: 1940–41
