= Branko Stanković =

Yugoslav footballer and manager (1921–2002)

Personal information
- Date of birth: 31 October 1921
- Place of birth: Sarajevo, Kingdom of Serbs, Croats and Slovenes
- Date of death: 20 February 2002 (aged 80)
- Place of death: Belgrade, FR Yugoslavia
- Position: Right back

Youth career
- 1936–1939: Slavija Sarajevo

Senior career*
Years	Team	Apps	(Gls)
1939–1941	Slavija Sarajevo		
1941–1945	BSK		
1946–1958	Red Star Belgrade	195	(14)
Total		195	(14)

International career
1946–1956	Yugoslavia	61	(3)

Managerial career
- 1960: Željezničar
- 1963–1964: Olimpija Ljubljana
- 1964–1967: Vojvodina
- 1966: Yugoslavia (co-coach)
- 1968–1973: AEK Athens
- 1973–1975: Aris
- 1975–1976: Porto
- 1976–1977: PAOK
- 1977–1978: Vojvodina
- 1978–1982: Red Star Belgrade
- 1982–1984: Fenerbahçe
- 1984–1986: Beşiktaş
- 1986–1987: Fenerbahçe
- 1988: Red Star Belgrade
- 1989: Karşıyaka
Medal record
Men's Football
Representing Yugoslavia
Olympic Games
Silver medal – second place	1948 London	Team
Silver medal – second place	1952 Helsinki	Team
- * Club domestic league appearances and goals

Branko "Stane" Stanković (Serbian Cyrillic: Бранко "Стане" Станковић, pronounced [brâːŋko stǎːŋkoʋitɕ]; 31 October 1921 – 20 February 2002) was a Yugoslav footballer and manager.

== Club career ==
He started his career in SK Slavija Sarajevo, as a youth player in 1936. In 1941 he escaped from Sarajevo and joined Yugoslav pre-war most successful club, BSK and played in the Serbian League during the war. In 1946 he came to Red Star Belgrade, where he established himself as one of the best defenders in the Yugoslav First League. Stanković played 195 games, with 14 scored goals.

== International career ==
Stanković mainly played for Red Star Belgrade and was capped 61 times for Yugoslavia. He participated at two World Cups and won a silver medal at each of the 1948 Olympics and the 1952 Olympics. His final international was a November 1956 friendly match away against England.

Because of his playing style, Stanković earned the nickname Ambassador. Players such as Bruno Belin, Milovan Đorić, Fahrudin Jusufi, Petar Krivokuća copy his playing style.

He retired in 1958 before his 37th birthday.

== Managerial career ==
Stanković started his managerial career in Sarajevo in 1960, as manager of Željezničar. In 1968 he moved to Greece and worked at AEK Athens. In his first season the club reached the quarter-finals of the quarter-finals of the European Cup. He left the club in February 1973 after a Cup elimination by Apollon Kalamarias. During his spell at AEK he won the Greek Championship in 1971. Later, he managed Red Star Belgrade and reached the 1979 UEFA Cup Final with them. Beside Red Star, he also managed a number of teams in different countries, such as Fenerbahçe and Beşiktaş in Turkey, Porto in Portugal, Aris and PAOK in Greece. He also coached Željezničar Sarajevo, Olimpija Ljubljana and FK Vojvodina in the spells. During 1966, he was also co-manager of the Yugoslavia national team along with Aleksandar Tirnanić, Miljan Miljanić, Rajko Mitić and Vujadin Boškov.

He is also famous because of his incident with one of the most popular Yugoslav players during that time, Dragan Stojković. Stanković retired from coaching in 1989.

== Personal life ==
He had a degree in Physical education. He was married and had two sons, Dragan and Ratko.

== Honours ==
=== Player ===
BSK

- Serbian Football League: 1942–43, 1943–44

Red Star Belgrade

- Yugoslav First League: 1951, 1952–53, 1955–56, 1955–57
- Yugoslav Cup: 1948, 1949, 1950

=== Manager ===
Vojvodina

- Yugoslav First League: 1965–66

AEK Athens

- Alpha Ethniki: 1970–71

Red Star Belgrade

- Yugoslav First League: 1979–80, 1980–81

Fenerbahçe

- Süper Lig: 1982–83
- Turkish Cup: 1982–83

Beşiktaş

- Süper Lig: 1985–86

== International goals ==
No.	Date	Venue	Opponent	Score	Result	Competition
1.	31 July 1948	Fulham, England	Luxembourg	1–1	6–1	1948 Summer Olympics
