= 1938–39 Yugoslav Football Championship =

16th State Championship
- Season: 1938–39
- Dates: 7 August 1938 – 30 April 1939
- Champions: BSK (5th title)
- Matches: 132
- Goals: 443 (3.36 per match)
- Top goalscorer: August Lešnik (22)

The 1938–39 Yugoslav Football Championship, officially called State Championship (Serbo-Croatian and Slovene: Državno prvenstvo; Serbian Cyrillic: Државно првенство) was the 16th season of the main association football competition in the Kingdom of Yugoslavia.

The championship was played in a round-robin league format, featuring 12 clubs which qualified either directly or through playoffs organized by various regional football associations. Five out of the previous six national champions took part in this season (with only Concordia Zagreb missing).

The defending champions were HAŠK, who finished fifth. First place was won by BSK from Belgrade, who won their fifth Yugoslav title with 5 points ahead of runners-up Građanski Zagreb. This was BSK's fifth national title, having previously won four in the period from 1931 to 1936, and it proved to be their last before the outbreak of World War II.

Top scorer was August Lešnik, then a 24-year-old seasoned forward for Građanski Zagreb, who scored 22 goals in 19 appearances, including five in a home game against Slavija Sarajevo in April 1939.

== Teams ==
The national league was expanded from 10 to 12 clubs for the 1938–39 season. The previous season's last place finisher, HŠK Concordia, were relegated, while the other top nine clubs earned an automatic spot in this year's edition.

The remaining three spots were filled with winners of three zonal qualifying playoffs. At the time, football in Yugoslavia was governed by 14 regional sub-federations, usually centered around a major city and named after it. Most of these organized a local championship, with winners entering the qualifying playoff.

- Zone I – Zagreb, Split, Ljubljana, and Banja Luka federations; won by Slavija Varaždin
- Zone II – Osijek, Subotica, Belgrade, Petrovgrad, and Novi Sad federations; won by Sparta Zemun
- Zone III – Skopje, Cetinje, Sarajevo, Niš, and Kragujevac federations; won by Građanski Skopje
Location of teams in the 1938–39 Yugoslav championship

As of April 1939 and end of season

Team	City	Managers	Ground
BASK	Belgrade	(Kingdom of Yugoslavia) Milutin Ivković	
BSK	Beograd	(Hungary) István Mészáros	
Građanski	Zagreb	(Hungary) Márton Bukovi	Stadion Građanskog
SK Gragjanski	Skopje	(Kingdom of Yugoslavia) Dušan Marković	
Hajduk	Split	(Hungary) Illés Spitz	Stari plac
HAŠK	Zagreb	(Hungary) Zoltán Opata	Stadion HAŠK
SK Jedinstvo	Belgrade	(Kingdom of Yugoslavia) Branislav Sekulić	Stadion Jedinstva
SK Jugoslavija	Belgrade	(Hungary) Gyula Feldmann	Stadion Jugoslavije
SK Ljubljana	Ljubljana	(Kingdom of Yugoslavia) Nedeljko Buljević	Stadion ob Tyrševi cesti
Slavija	Sarajevo		
Slavija	Varaždin	(Austria) Karl Mütsch	
SK Zemun	Zemun	(Kingdom of Yugoslavia) Hans Šnajder	

Managerial changes during season

- BSK – Sándor Nemes replaced by István Mészáros
- Gragjanski – Vladimir Kujundžić replaced by Dušan Marković
- SK Zemun – Adolf Engel replaced by Hans Šnajder

== League ==
Pos	Team	Pld	W	D	L	GF	GA	GAv	Pts
1	BSK (C)	22	17	3	2	67	14	4.786	37
2	Građanski Zagreb	22	14	4	4	53	17	3.118	32
3	SK Jugoslavija	22	12	4	6	37	24	1.542	28
4	Hajduk Split	22	11	5	6	51	30	1.700	27
5	HAŠK	22	10	5	7	41	27	1.519	25
6	SK Jedinstvo	22	8	4	10	35	40	0.875	20
7	Slavija Sarajevo	22	7	5	10	34	43	0.791	19
8	BASK	22	6	7	9	27	36	0.750	19
9	SK Ljubljana	22	7	4	11	23	41	0.561	18
10	Građanski Skopje	22	7	2	13	31	57	0.544	16
11	Sparta Zemun	22	5	3	14	21	60	0.350	13
12	Slavija Varaždin	22	4	2	16	23	54	0.426	10

Source: rsssf.org
(C) Champions

== Results ==
Home \ Away	BAS	BSK	GRS	GRZ	HAJ	HŠK	JED	JUG	LJU	SLS	SLV	SPZ
BASK		0–5	6–2	2–1	3–1	0–0	1–4	3–2	1–1	1–1	3–1	0–1
BSK	2–0		3–1	0–1	2–0	2–2	4–0	1–2	5–0	4–1	9–0	4–0
Građanski Skopje	1–0	1–2		1–4	2–5	3–5	1–1	2–0	2–1	4–1	2–1	1–1
Građanski Zagreb	2–2	1–2	2–1		3–0	1–1	5–0	1–1	6–0	6–0	3–1	4–0
Hajduk Split	3–0	2–2	4–1	0–1		3–1	3–2	3–0	4–0	2–2	5–1	6–0
HAŠK	1–1	0–1	8–0	0–1	1–2		1–5	3–0	2–0	2–1	0–0	2–0
SK Jedinstvo	3–3	0–4	1–2	0–2	1–1	2–1		1–2	4–1	2–2	1–0	3–0
SK Jugoslavija	1–0	1–1	2–0	2–1	1–0	0–2	0–1		2–0	3–0	0–0	7–0
SK Ljubljana	2–0	1–2	1–2	0–0	2–1	2–0	2–0	0–0		0–0	3–1	3–2
Slavija Sarajevo	3–0	1–2	3–2	2–1	1–2	1–2	3–1	2–4	2–0		3–1	3–1
Slavija Varaždin	0–0	0–5	2–0	2–4	1–1	1–2	1–3	3–4	3–1	2–1		2–3
Sparta Zemun	0–1	0–5	4–1	0–3	3–3	1–5	1–0	0–3	2–3	1–1	1–0	

Source: DataSoccer.it
Legend: Blue = home team win; Yellow = draw; Red = away team win.

== Winning squad ==
Champions:

BSK Beograd (manager: Sándor Nemes; then István Mészáros)

- GK – Anton Puhar (15)
- GK – Srđan Mrkušić (7)
- DF – Ernest Dubac (19/2)
- DF – Đorđe Stojiljković (19/0)
- DF – Predrag Radovanović (3/0)
- DF – Jovan Beleslin (2/0)
- DF – Milorad Rančić (2/0)
- MF – Gustav Lechner (22/0)
- MF – Prvoslav Dragićević (15/0)
- MF – Bruno Knežević (7/0)
- MF – Ivan Stevović (5/0)
- FW – Svetislav Glišović (22/11)
- FW – Đorđe Vujadinović (21/12)
- FW – Petar Manola (16/0)
- FW – Svetislav Valjarević (15/10)
- FW – Vojin Božović (14/9)
- FW – Dobrivoje Zečević (13/9)
- FW – Ján Podhradský (12/9)
- FW – Milorad Nikolić (10/4)
- FW – Blagoje Marjanović (3/0)

== Top scorers ==
Final goalscoring position, number of goals, player/players and club.

- 22 goals – August Lešnik (Građanski Zagreb)
- 19 goals – Frane Matošić (Hajduk Split)
- 15 goals – Aleksandar Petrović (Jugoslavija)
- 13 goals – Jozo Matošić (Hajduk Split), Ratko Kacian (HAŠK), Manojlo Živković (Jedinstvo)
- 12 goals – Đorđe Vujadinović (BSK)
- 11 goals – Svetislav Glišović (BSK), Milan Rajlić (Slavija Sarajevo), Slavko Pavletić (Slavija Varaždin)

== See also ==
- Yugoslav Cup
- Yugoslav League Championship
- Football Association of Yugoslavia
