= List of Yugoslav Cup winning managers =

This is a list of Yugoslav Cup winning football managers.

Tomislav Ivić won the tournament on four occasions, leading Hajduk Split to success in the 1972, 1973, 1974, 1976 Finals; two other managers have won the title on three occasions.

None of the managers have won the title with two different sides, but Illés Spitz, Ivan Jazbinšek, Josip Duvančić and Milovan Ćirić have appeared in the finals leading two different sides.

== Winning managers ==
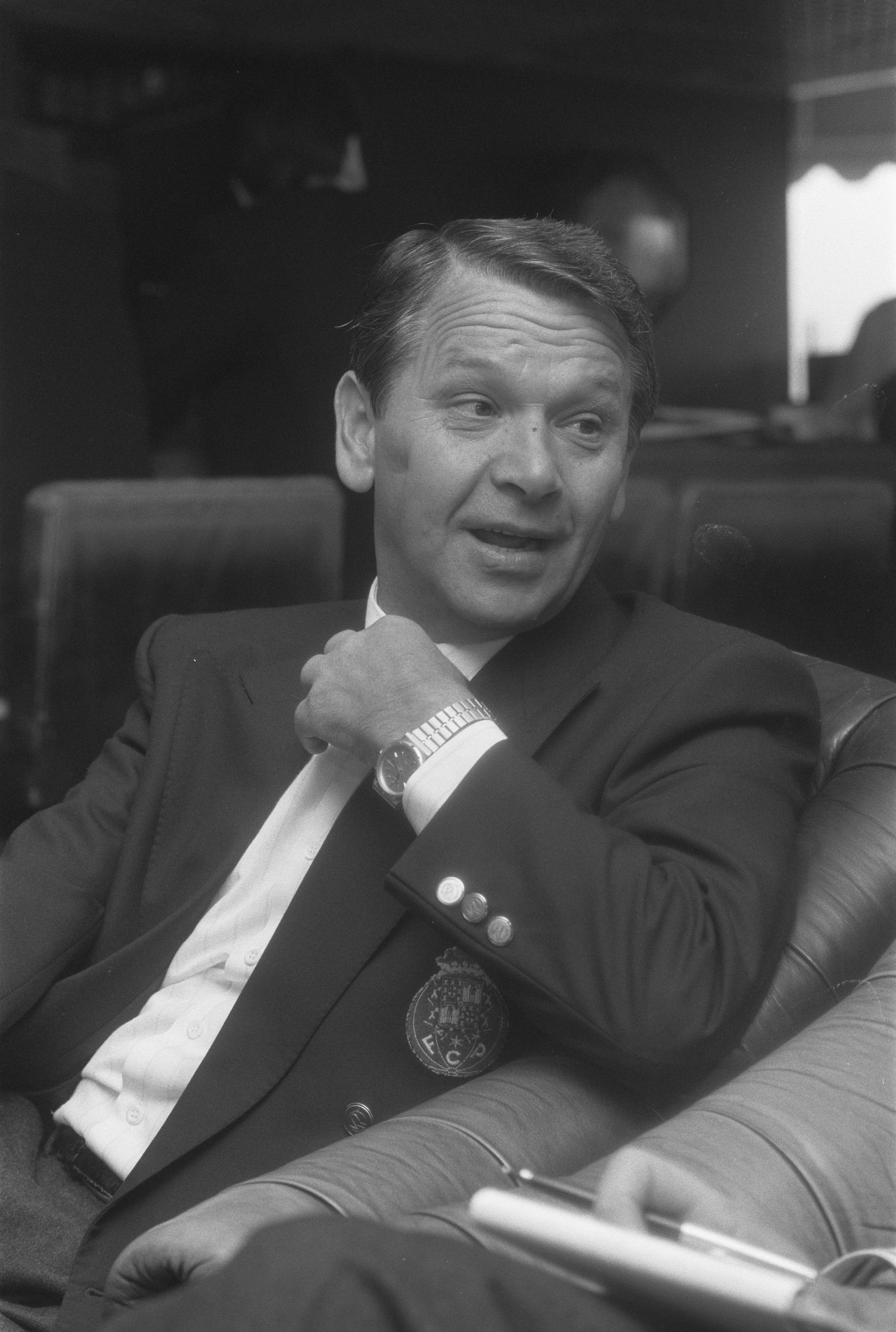
Tomislav Ivić, won four consecutive cups with Hajduk Split between 1974 and 1976

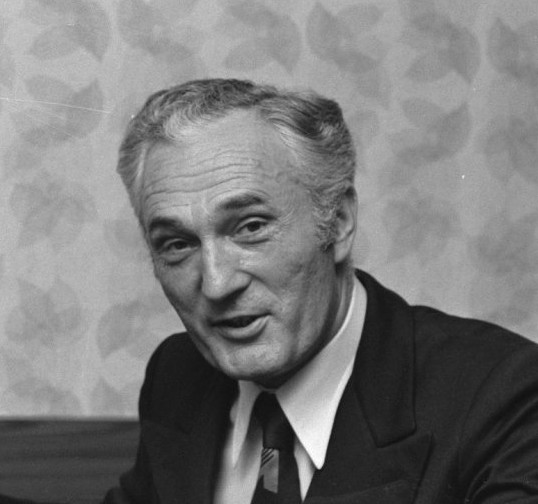
Milorad Pavić, won three cups with Red Star (1958, 1959, 1964)

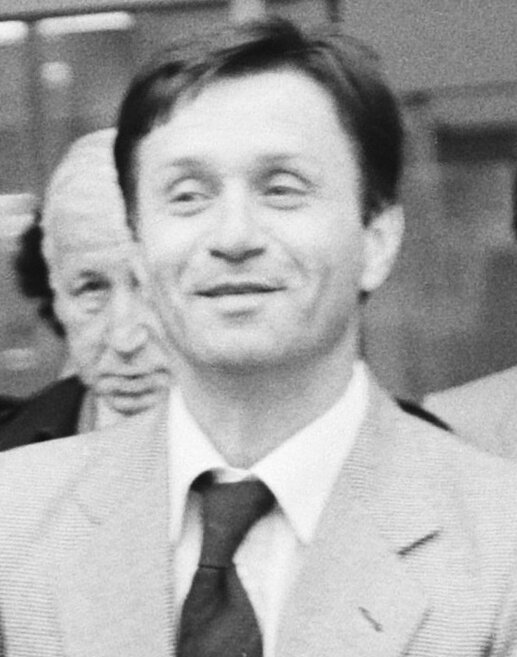
Miroslav Blažević, winning manager in 1983 with Dinamo Zagreb

Final	Winning manager	Winning club	Losing manager	Losing club
1947 (1st)	Illés Spitz	Partizan (1)	Negoslav Radosavljević	Naša Krila
1948 (2nd)	Svetislav Glišović	Red Star (1)	Illés Spitz	Partizan
1949 (3rd)	Aleksandar Tomašević	Red Star (2)	Negoslav Radosavljević	Naša Krila
1950 (4th)	Aleksandar Tomašević	Red Star (3)	Bernard Hügl	Dinamo Zagreb
1951 (5th)	Bernard Hügl	Dinamo Zagreb (1)	Ljubiša Broćić	Vojvodina
1952 (6th)	Toni Pogačnik	Partizan (2)	Branislav Sekulić	Red Star
1953 (7th)	Blagoje Marjanović	BSK Belgrade (1)	Jozo Matošić	Hajduk Split
1954 (8th)	Illés Spitz	Partizan (3)	Milovan Ćirić	Red Star
1955 (9th)	Blagoje Marjanović	BSK Belgrade (2)	Ljubo Benčić	Hajduk Split
1957 (10th)	Florijan Matekalo	Partizan (4)	Illés Spitz	Radnički Beograd
1958 (11th)	Milorad Pavić	Red Star (4)	Ratomir Čabrić	Velež
1959 (12th)	Milorad Pavić	Red Star (5)	Illés Spitz	Partizan
1960 (13th)	Milan Antolković	Dinamo Zagreb (2)	Illés Spitz	Partizan
1961 (14th)	Antal Lyka	Vardar (1)	Ivan Jazbinšek	Varteks
1962 (15th)	Milovan Ćirić	OFK Beograd (1)	Lajoš Jakovetić	Spartak Subotica
1963 (16th)	Milan Antolković	Dinamo Zagreb (3)	Florijan Matekalo	Hajduk Split
1964 (17th)	Milorad Pavić	Red Star (6)	Milan Antolković	Dinamo Zagreb
1965 (18th)	Vlatko Konjevod	Dinamo Zagreb (4)	Božidar Dedović	Budućnost
1966 (19th)	Dragiša Milić	OFK Beograd (2)	Ivan Jazbinšek	Dinamo Zagreb
1967 (20th)	Dušan Nenković	Hajduk Split (1)	Miroslav Brozović	Sarajevo
1968 (21st)	Miljan Miljanić	Red Star (7)	Radojica Radojičić	Bor
1969 (22nd)	Ivica Horvat	Dinamo Zagreb (5)	Dušan Nenković	Hajduk Split
1970 (23rd)	Miljan Miljanić	Red Star (8)	Nedeljko Gugolj	Olimpija Ljubljana
1971 (24th)	Miljan Miljanić	Red Star (9)	Josip Duvančić	Sloboda Tuzla
1972 (25th)	Tomislav Ivić	Hajduk Split (2)	Dražan Jerković	Dinamo Zagreb
1973 (26th)	Tomislav Ivić	Hajduk Split (3)	Miljan Miljanić	Red Star
1974 (27th)	Tomislav Ivić	Hajduk Split (4)	Boris Marović	Borac Banja Luka
1976 (28th)	Tomislav Ivić	Hajduk Split (5)	Mirko Bazić	Dinamo Zagreb
1977 (29th)	Josip Duvančić	Hajduk Split (6)	Marko Valok	Budućnost
1978 (30th)	Dragutin Spasojević	Rijeka (1)	Husni Madjuni	Trepča
1979 (31st)	Marijan Brnčić	Rijeka (2)	Milutin Šoškić	Partizan
1980 (32nd)	Vlatko Marković	Dinamo Zagreb (6)	Branko Stanković	Red Star
1981 (33rd)	Miloš Milutinović	Velež (1)	Ivica Osim	Željezničar
1982 (34th)	Branko Stanković	Red Star (10)	Miroslav Blažević	Dinamo Zagreb
1983 (35th)	Miroslav Blažević	Dinamo Zagreb (7)	Boško Antić	Sarajevo
1984 (36th)	Petar Nadoveza	Hajduk Split (7)	Gojko Zec	Red Star
1985 (37th)	Gojko Zec	Red Star (11)	Zdenko Kobeščak	Dinamo Zagreb
1986 (38th)	Dušan Bajević	Velež (2)	Miroslav Blažević	Dinamo Zagreb
1987 (39th)	Josip Skoblar	Hajduk Split (8)	Mladen Vranković	Rijeka
1988 (40th)	Husnija Fazlić	Borac Banja Luka (1)	Velibor Vasović	Red Star
1989 (41st)	Momčilo Vukotić	Partizan (5)	Žarko Barbarić	Velež
1990 (42nd)	Dragoslav Šekularac	Red Star (12)	Luka Peruzović	Hajduk Split
1991 (43rd)	Josip Skoblar	Hajduk Split (9)	Ljubomir Petrović	Red Star
1992 (44th)	Ivica Osim	Partizan (6)	Vladica Popović	Red Star

=== By individual ===
Rank	Name	Winners	Club(s)	Winning years
1	(Socialist Federal Republic of Yugoslavia) Tomislav Ivić	4	Hajduk Split	1972, 1973, 1974, 1976
2	(Hungary) Illés Spitz	3	Partizan, Vardar	1947, 1954, 1961
2	(Socialist Federal Republic of Yugoslavia) Milorad Pavić	3	Red Star	1958, 1959, 1964
2	(Socialist Federal Republic of Yugoslavia) Miljan Miljanić	3	Red Star	1968, 1970, 1971
5	(Socialist Federal Republic of Yugoslavia) Aleksandar Tomašević	2	Red Star	1949, 1950
5	(Socialist Federal Republic of Yugoslavia) Blagoje Marjanović	2	BSK Belgrade	1953, 1955
5	(Socialist Federal Republic of Yugoslavia) Milan Antolković	2	Dinamo Zagreb	1960, 1963
5	(Socialist Federal Republic of Yugoslavia) Josip Skoblar	2	Hajduk Split	1987, 1991
