= Illés Spitz =

Hungarian footballer (1902–1961)

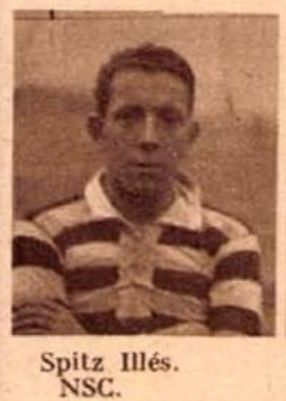

Personal information
- Full name: Illés Spitz
- Date of birth: 2 February 1902
- Place of birth: Budapest, Austro-Hungary
- Date of death: 1 October 1961 (aged 59)
- Place of death: Skopje, FPR Yugoslavia
- Position: Forward

Senior career*
Years	Team	Apps	(Gls)
1919–1927	Nemzeti SC	84	(34)
1927–1932	Újpest	87	(57)
1932–1933	Hungaria	6	(2)
1935	St. Gallen		
1936	Zürich		

International career
1925–1931	Hungary	6	(3)

Managerial career
- 1937–1939: Hajduk Split
- 1939–1941: Građanski Skopje
- 1941–1946: Macedonia Skopje
- 1946: SR Macedonia
- 1946–1951: Partizan
- 1953: Partizan
- 1954–1955: Partizan
- 1955–1957: Radnički Belgrade
- 1958–1960: Partizan
- 1960–1961: Vardar (technical director)
- * Club domestic league appearances and goals

Illés Spitz (Serbo-Croatian: Ileš Špic / Илеш Шпиц); 2 February 1902 – 1 October 1961) was a Hungarian Jewish international football player and manager, best known for his work in Yugoslav football in the 1940s and 1950s. Spitz is among the few survivors of the Holocaust from Macedonia, after being saved by the Bulgarian authorities.

== Playing career ==
Illés was part of the Újpest FC's first "golden era" helping the club win the Coupe des Nations 1930 and three championships. In 1935 he moved to Switzerland where he played one season in FC St. Gallen and another in FC Zürich. During his playing career he played over 1,000 matches and scored over 600 goals.

Spitz also played a total of six matches for the Hungary national football team, having scored three goals.

== Managerial career ==
After finishing his playing career in Switzerland, Illés moved to Yugoslavia where he had a long managerial career. In 1937 he took charge of HNK Hajduk Split, one of the dominant clubs of the Yugoslav Championship. Despite not winning any titles during his two-year spell there, he is remembered in Split for having formed the generation that would later win the Croatian League in the 1940–41 season and end the years of disappointment the club had during the 1930s.

In 1939 he moved to Gragjanski Skopje, the top Macedonian club at the time, which played in the regional Serbian League, which served as a qualifier for the final stage of the Yugoslav national championship.

In 1941 with the beginning of the Second World War, the region of Vardarska Banovina where Gragjanski was located, was annexed by Bulgaria, and the club was merged with other city clubs to form Macedonia Skopje. Spitz remained at the helm at the reformed club, along with most of players of Gragjanski, some even going on to become Bulgarian internationals. The club competed in the Bulgarian Championship, which was played in a knockout tournament format. In the 1942 season Spitz managed to take Macedonia Skopje club to the league final, where they lost to Levski Sofia in October that year.

In March 1943, Spitz was arrested by Bulgarian authorities and because of his Jewish descent was put on a train to Treblinka extermination camp in eastern Poland. However, he was rescued by the club's executives Dimitar Chkatrov and Dimitar Gyuzelov. They took immediate actions after his arrest and succeeded in having Spitz taken down from the train near Surdulica in modern southern Serbia, then in Bulgaria.

At the end of the war, the region returned to Yugoslavia. However, the country was no longer a monarchy, and the new communist authorities disbanded most existing clubs to create new ones. Spitz stayed in Skopje until 1946, but then the newly formed FK Partizan in Belgrade - officially established as the club sponsored by the Yugoslav People's Army (JNA) - was recruiting the best players from all over the country, and Spitz was brought in from Skopje, along with the star player Kiril Simonovski.

Spitz was successful in his job as the first manager of Partizan in the 1940s, winning two Yugoslav First League titles and three Yugoslav Cups. He later manager a smaller Belgrade side, FK Radnički Beograd and took them to the Yugoslav cup final in 1957. By 1960 Spitz led his teams in the Yugoslav cup final a total of seven times, more than any other manager.

In 1960, he returned to Skopje as technical director of the city's new top-flight team, FK Vardar, and it was in the dressing room, after a league match, that he suddenly died from a heart attack on 1 October 1961.

== Honours ==
=== Player ===
Újpest

- Hungarian League: 1929–30, 1930–31
- Coupe des Nations 1930
- Mitropa Cup: 1929

=== Manager ===
Partizan

- Yugoslav First League: 1946–47, 1948–49
- Yugoslav Cup: 1947, 1952, 1954

Vardar

- Yugoslav Cup: 1960–61
