= FK Slavija Pržino =

Slavija Pržino
- Full name: Fudbalski klub Slavija Pržino
- Founded: 1919; 106 years ago
- Ground: Jovan Mandarovski Stadium
- Capacity: 500
- Chairman: Nikola Mandarovski
- Manager: Ilija Mandarov
- League: OFS Kisela Voda
- 2024–25: OFS Kisela Voda, 2nd
Home colours	Away colours

FK Slavija Pržino (Macedonian: ФК Славија Пржино) is a football club from the town Pržino near Skopje, Republic of Macedonia. They currently play in the OFS Kisela Voda league.

== History ==
The club was founded in 1919. It stands as the only club that still competes in Macedonian football and to have won a title in the Skoplje Football Subassociation, which they won in 1935.

== Recent seasons ==
Season	League								
Season	Division	P	W	D	L	F	A	Pts	Pos
2004–05	3. MFL North	30	14	5	11	66	46	47	4th
2005–06	3. MFL North	28	14	1	13	52	47	43	5th
2006–07	3. MFL North	29	11	4	14	49	58	37	10th
2007–08	3. MFL North	30	11	1	18	47	96	34	13th
2008–09	3. MFL North B	16	9	3	4	37	27	30	2nd
2009–10	3. MFL North A	23	17	1	5	54	27	52	2nd
2010–11	3. MFL North A	21	8	4	9	36	33	28	6th
2011–12	3. MFL North	33	13	6	14	47	64	45	14th
2012–13	3. MFL North	28	7	3	18	41	60	24	14th ↓
2013–14	OFS Kisela Voda	13	11	0	2	36	19	33	1st ↑
2014–15	3. MFL North	19	4	4	11	29	53	16	10th
2015–16	3. MFL North	22	9	1	12	39	58	28	10th
2016–17	3. MFL North	22	3	0	19	27	99	9	12th ↓
2017–18	OFS Kisela Voda	10	3	1	6	24	31	10	4th
2018–19	OFS Kisela Voda	13	10	0	3	31	17	30	3rd
2019–20	OFS Kisela Voda	8	2	1	5	16	23	7	7th
2020–21	...	...	...	...	...	...	...	...	...
2021–22	...	...	...	...	...	...	...	...	...
2022–23	OFS Kisela Voda	17	8	3	6	36	31	27	4th
2023–24	OFS Kisela Voda	16	6	1	9	35	47	19	6th
2024–25	OFS Kisela Voda	18	12	2	4	58	32	38	2nd
