= Ernest Dubac =

Croatian footballer (1914–1985)

Personal information
- Date of birth: 15 February 1914
- Place of birth: Osijek, Austria-Hungary
- Date of death: 27 February 1985 (aged 71)
- Place of death: Osijek, SFR Yugoslavia
- Position: Centre-back

Youth career
- Hajduk Osijek

Senior career*
Years	Team	Apps	(Gls)
- Hajduk Osijek
–1937	Slavija Osijek		
1937–1941	BSK Belgrade		
1941–1944	Građanski Zagreb	51	(3)

International career
1938–1941	Yugoslavia	14	(0)
1941–1944	Independent State Croatia	15	(0)

Managerial career
- 1951–1955: Osijek
- 1958: Čelik Zenica
- 1959–1966: Trešnjevka
- * Club domestic league appearances and goals

Ernest Dubac (15 February 1914 – 27 February 1985) was a Croatian and Yugoslav professional football player and football manager.

== Club career ==
Born in Osijek, Dubac started his career with Hajduk Osijek before moving to JŠK Slavija Osijek. In 1937, he joined BSK Belgrade where he became one of the best centre-backs in the country and became a regular in the national team. He played for BSK until 1941 and won the 1938–39 Yugoslav Championship.

When World War II started in Yugoslavia, he moved to HŠK Građanski Zagreb in the Croatian First League in 1941. He was champion of the Independent State of Croatia with Građanski in 1943, with whom he finished his career a year later.

== International career ==
Dubac played 14 games for the Yugoslavia national team, making his debut in a 1–0 home win against Poland in Belgrade on 3 August 1938. He then joined the Independent Croatia national team in 1941, playing all 15 games which the team played during World War II.

== Managerial career ==
After retiring, Dubac became a manager, managing NK Osijek from 1951 to 1955, NK Čelik Zenica in 1958 and NK Trešnjevka from 1959 to 1966. He won the Croatian-Slovenian League (II tier competition of football in Yugoslavia at the time) with Osijek in the 1952–53 season and got the club promoted to the Yugoslav First League.

He won the Second League with Trešnjevka as well, this time in the 1962–63 season in the West Division. He then led Trešnjevka in the Yugoslav First League for three seasons, from 1963 to 1966, until the club got relegated.

== Personal life ==
In later life, Dubac became a dentist, after which he retired from that job as well in 1978. Seven years later, he died in his hometown of Osijek on 25 February 1985 at the age of 71.

== Honours ==
=== Player ===
BSK Belgrade

- Yugoslav First League: 1938–39
- Serbian Football League: 1940–41

Građanski Zagreb

- Independent State of Croatia championship: 1943

=== Manager ===
Osijek

- Croatian-Slovenian League (II tier competition in Yugoslavia at the time): 1952–53

Trešnjevka

- Yugoslav Second League - West Division: 1962–63
