= Serbian Football Championship =

The Serbian Football Championship was the unofficial championship of Serbia organized by the Belgrade Football Subassociation (a Belgrade branch of the Football Association of Yugoslavia was covering territory of former Kingdom of Serbia, Vojvodina and eastern part of Bosnia and Herzegovina) and had one edition in 1920, before Subotica Football Subassociation started its own championship in 1920/21 in Bačka region. It was a pioneer football championship in Serbia, and one of the predecessors of the Yugoslav Football Championship which started being played in 1923.

== Seasons ==
The editions were:

- 1920 Serbian Football Championship (winner: BSK Belgrade)
- 1920–21 Serbian Football Championship (winner: BSK Belgrade)
- 1921–22 Serbian Football Championship (winner: BSK Belgrade)
