= 1942–43 Serbian League =

Serbian League
- Season: 1942-43
- Champions: BSK Beograd
- Matches: 90
- Goals: 370 (4.11 per match)

The 1942–43 Serbian League (Serbian: 1942–43 Српска лига / 1942–43 Srpska liga) was a top level football league of the Serbian military administration (Serbia under German occupation) in the 1942–43 season. It was won by BSK Belgrade.

== Final table ==
Pos	Team	Pld	W	D	L	GF	GA	GD	Pts
1	BSK Beograd	18	14	3	1	96	10	+86	31
2	SK 1913	18	11	4	3	61	14	+47	26
3	Obilić	18	10	3	5	39	30	+9	23
4	Čukarički SK	18	9	4	5	33	26	+7	22
5	Vitez	18	9	2	7	33	35	−2	20
6	Sloga	18	6	4	8	26	41	−15	16
7	Jedinstvo Beograd	18	5	4	9	29	43	−14	14
8	Balkan	18	5	2	11	14	73	−59	12
9	BASK	18	5	1	12	25	45	−20	11
10	Mitić	18	1	3	14	14	53	−39	5

Source: rsssf.org

== See also ==
- Serbian Football League (1940–1944)
- Serbia under German occupation
