= Crniče (settlement in Skopje) =

Crniče is a settlement in the Kisela Voda Municipality in North Macedonia, which shares borders with the settlements Pržino and Kisela Voda. It is home to more than 300 residents.

== Places ==
- Elementary School "Kuzman Josifovski - Pitu"

- Church "St. Paraskevi - Crnice

== Demographics ==
A large number of Crnice residents are Macedonians.
