= Prvoslav Dragićević =

Serbian footballer and manager

Personal information
- Date of birth: March 4, 1914
- Place of birth: Kragujevac, Kingdom of Serbia
- Date of death: December 27, 1974 (aged 60)
- Place of death: Belgrade, SFR Yugoslavia
- Position: Midfielder

Youth career
- BSK Beograd

Senior career*
| Years | Team | Apps | (Gls) |
| 1937–1938 | Jedinstvo Beograd | 8 | (0) |
| 1938–1940 | BSK Beograd | 25 | (0) |
| 1946–1947 | Radnički Beograd | | |
| 1947–1949 | Dinamo Pančevo | 25 | (3) |

International career
| 1939–1940 | Yugoslavia | 6 | (0) |

Managerial career
- 1954–1955: Željezničar Sarajevo
- 1956–1957: Olympiacos
- 1961: Sloga Kraljevo
- * Club domestic league appearances and goals

Prvoslav Dragićević (Serbian Cyrillic: Првослав Драгићевић; 4 March 1914 – 27 December 1974) was a Serbian football manager and player.

== Club career ==
Dragićević played at SK Jedinstvo Beograd and BSK Beograd from 1936 to 1941 as a midfielder, and he was part of the memorable midfield line formed with Petar Manola and Gustav Lechner. The team won the Yugoslav First League in 1939. During his career he also played with Belgrade club Radnički and Dinamo Pančevo where he finished his playing career in 1949.

== International career ==
He has played six matches for the national team from 1939 to 1940. After the Germans invaded Yugoslavia in 1941, he left the country.

== Manerial career ==
=== Željezničar Sarajevo ===
He coached FK Željezničar Sarajevo in the 1954–55 season. Although the team secured only 11th place, it sufficed to save them from relegation.

=== Olympiacos ===
In 1956, he went to Greece to coach Olympiacos. The team won the double in the 1956–57 season. The league was won after a long run which ended with Olympiacos winning a play-off match against eternal rivals Panathinaikos in the neutral Nikos Goumas Stadium (1–0). In the Cup, Olympiacos beat AEK Athens 1–0 in the quarter-finals with a goal by Babis Kotridis, and once again Panathinaikos (1–0) in the semi-finals. The team concluded by winning Iraklis 2–0 in the final and celebrated the first of three consecutive doubles (1957, 1958, 1959) that still remains a record for Greek teams.

== Honours ==
=== Player ===
BSK Beograd

- Yugoslav Championship: 1938–39

=== Manager ===
Olympiacos

- Panhellenic Championship: 1956–57
- Greek Cup: 1956–57
