= Petar Manola =

Footballer (1918–2004)

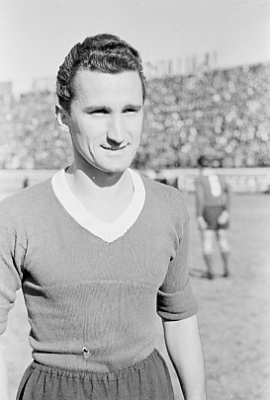

Personal information
- Date of birth: 28 February 1918
- Place of birth: Jajce, Bosnia and Herzegovina, Austria-Hungary
- Date of death: 2004 (aged 85–86)
- Place of death: Rome, Italy
- Position: Midfielder

Senior career*
Years	Team	Apps	(Gls)
1934–1937	Slavija Sarajevo	26	(8)
1937–1940	BSK Belgrade	29	(0)
1942–1946	Lazio	15	(5)
1947	Lyon		
1947–1948	Red Star	1	(0)
1948–1949	Napoli	14	(1)
1949–1950	Cavese		
1950–1951	Benevento		
1951–1956	Turris		

International career
1939–1941	Kingdom of Yugoslavia	9	(0)
- * Club domestic league appearances and goals

Petar Manola (Bosnian: Петар Манола; 28 February 1918 – 2004) was a Yugoslav footballer who played as a midfielder.

== Club career ==
Born in Jajce, in Bosnia and Herzegovina, then still part of the Austro-Hungarian Empire, he started his career in Slavija Sarajevo where he played between 1931 and 1936 but, his greatest success was achieved while playing in BSK Beograd, between 1936 and 1942, and made part of the memorable midfield line formed with Prvoslav Dragičević and Gustav Lechner, that won the Yugoslav First League in 1939. After the start of the World War II, he left Yugoslavia and continued his career in Lazio playing in Italian Serie A. Between January 1947 and summer 1948 he played in France, first in Second Division Olympique Lyonnais, and then in Ligue 1 famous club Red Star. Afterwards, he returned to Italy where he played in Napoli, in the 1948–49 season, and then represented lower leagues clubs like Cavese, Benevento and Turris. He ended his playing career in 1956.

== International career ==
While playing in BSK Belgrade he played nine matches for the Kingdom of Yugoslavia national team.

== Honours ==
BSK Belgrade

- Yugoslav First League: 1938-39
