= Pržino =

Pržino is a settlement in the Kisela Voda Municipality in the city of Skopje, which shares borders with the settlements: Crniče (settlement in Skopje) from the Kisela Voda Municipality and Vodno (settlement) from the Centar Municipality. In this settlement, there are around 300 families, most of them live in the houses.

== Places ==
- Institute of Earthquake Engineering and Engineering of Seismology

== Sports ==
Local football club FK Slavija Skopje plays at the Jovan Mandarovski Stadium.

== Demography ==
A large number of Przino residents are Macedonians.
