= Veliki Bečkerek Football Subassociation =

Former Yugoslavian Football Subassociation

The Veliki Bečkerek Football Subassociation (Serbo-Croato-Slovenian: Velikobečkerečki loptački podsavez / Великобечкеречки лоптачки подсавез), renamed in 1935 to Petrovgrad Football Subassociation (Petrovgradski loptački podsavez / Петровградски лоптачки подсавез) was one of the regional football governing bodies overseen by the Football Association of Yugoslavia. It was formed in Vršac on 11 May 1930 having been part of the Belgrade Football Subassociation until then.

Its seat was in Veliki Bečkerek, renamed to Petrovgrad in 1935, and included the clubs from the territory of the province (župa) of Banat - the municipalities of Vršac, Veliki Bečkerek (Petrovgrad), Kikinda, Novi Bečej and Pančevo. In 1939 the Subassociation counts 32 clubs.

The presidents of the Veliki Bečkerek Football Subassociation were Josip Podgradski (1930 - 1931), Dušan Bratić (1931 - 1936) and Andrija Mirković (1936 - 1941).

== Seasons and champions ==
- 1931: The season was not finished as the entire league system modified.
- 1932: Obilić V. Bečkerek
- 1933: ŽAK V. Bečkerek. Note: The clubs that played in the 1932–33 Yugoslav Football Championship did not participated, as the two leagues were played simultaneously and the BLP had a qualifying character for the next season.
- 1934: ŽSK V. Bečkerek
- 1935:
- 1936: ŽAK V. Kikinda
- 1937: Note: It was adopted a system where the clubs competing in the national championship do not compete at subassociation level as well.
- 1938: ŽSK Petrograd
- 1939: Jugoslavija Jabuka
- 1940: Borac Petrovgrad
- 1941: Jugoslavija Jabuka
