= Dušan Marković (footballer, born 1906) =

Serbian association football player

Personal information
- Date of birth: 9 March 1906
- Place of birth: Krčedin, Kingdom of Croatia-Slavonia, Austria-Hungary
- Date of death: 19 November 1974 (aged 68)
- Place of death: Novi Sad, SR Serbia, SFR Yugoslavia
- Position: Forward

Senior career*
Years	Team	Apps	(Gls)
1921–1935	Vojvodina		
1935–1937	BSK Beograd		
1937–1938	Grenoble Foot 38		

International career
1932	Kingdom of Yugoslavia	1	(0)

Managerial career
- 1939: Gragjanski Skopje
- 1939–1941: Željezničar
- * Club domestic league appearances and goals

Dušan "Luks" Marković (Serbian Cyrillic: Душан "Лукс" Mapкoвић; 9 March 1906 – 29 November 1974) was a Serbian football player and football manager.

He was described by local press as an effective striker. Anecdotally, he performed very well every time he played against BSK Belgrade, having scored at least once in every match he played against them.

== Playing career ==
=== Club ===
He spent most of his career with FK Vojvodina where he played for 14 years, between 1921 until 1935 being one of their most influential players of the pre-war period. Afterward, he had short spells with BSK Belgrade and French club Grenoble.

=== International ===
He was part of the Yugoslavia national football team for some period, but he only played one match, as a substitute of the famous striker Blagoje Marjanović in a friendly match played on 9 October 1932, in Prague, against Czechoslovakia, a 2–1 win.

== Managerial career ==
After retiring, he remained linked to football as a manager, having coached some clubs in Yugoslavia. He coached Gragjanski Skopje in the 1938–39 Yugoslav Football Championship and Željezničar between 1939 and 1941.

== Personal life ==
=== Death ===
He died in 1974, in the aftermath of a prostate surgery.
