= Kiril Simonovski =

Macedonian footballer

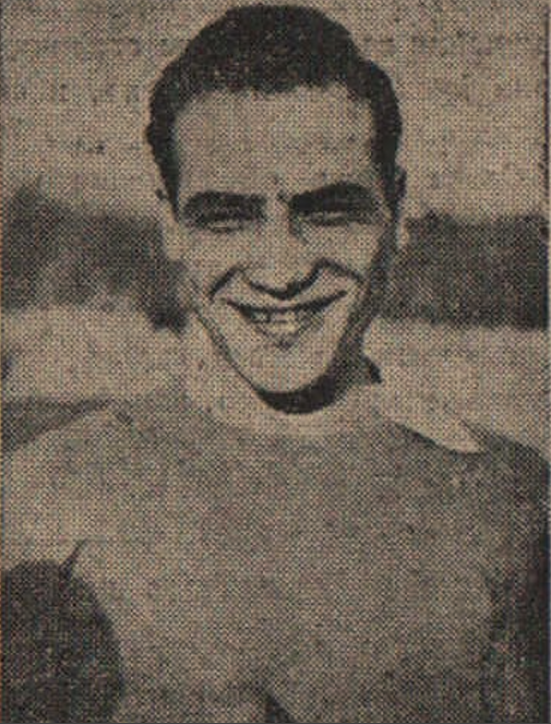

Personal information
- Date of birth: 19 October 1915
- Place of birth: Skopje, Bulgarian occupation zone of Serbia (now North Macedonia)
- Date of death: 12 June 1984 (aged 68)
- Place of death: Belgrade, SR Serbia, SFR Yugoslavia
- Positions: Left winger; left back

Youth career
- Jug Skopje

Senior career*
Years	Team	Apps	(Gls)
1938–1939	Gragjanski Skopje	21	(3)
1942–1945	Makedonija Skopje		
1945–1950	Partizan	53	(18)
1950–1953	Vardar	75	(21)

International career
1942	Bulgaria	2	(0)
1946–1949	Yugoslavia	10	(1)

Managerial career
- 1953–1955: Vardar
- 1955: Aris
- 1956–1957: Partizan
- 1957–1958: Vardar
- 1959–1960: Apollon Athens
- 1960–1962: Olympiacos
- 1963: Partizan
- 1963–1966: Apollon Athens
- 1966: Partizan
- 1969–1970: Partizan
- 1970–1972: Vardar
- * Club domestic league appearances and goals

Kiril Simonovski (Macedonian: Кирил Симоновски; 19 October 1915 – 12 June 1984) was a Yugoslav football manager and player.

== Playing career ==
=== Club ===
He started playing football in a local club in Skopje named FK Jug, before moving to Gragjanski Skopje in 1938. In 1941, during World War II and the Axis invasion of Yugoslavia, most of the region of the then Vardarska Banovina was occupied by the Bulgarian forces and in that period, Gragjanski was renamed to Makedonija Skopie. The club finished in second place in the 1942 Bulgarian State Championship, and during this period, Simonovski played two matches for the Bulgarian national team with his birth name (as Kiril Simeonov). At the end of the war, Simonovski moved to Belgrade and signed with newly formed FK Partizan where he will play all the way until 1950, winning two national championships and one cup.

=== International ===
It was in this period that he became the first Macedonian to play for the post-1945 Yugoslavia national team, having played a total of 10 matches and scored once.

== Managerial career ==
After retiring from playing, Simonovski coached Partizan, Vardar, Aris and Olympiacos, among several other clubs in Yugoslavia, Greece and Cyprus.

== Personal life ==
His brother Blagoje also played for Bulgaria.

== Honours ==
=== Player ===
Partizan

- Yugoslav First League: 1946–47, 1948–49
- Yugoslav Cup: 1947

=== Coach ===
Partizan

- Yugoslav Cup: 1956–57

Olympiacos

- Greek Cup: 1960–61
