= 1920 Serbian Football Championship =

The Serbian Football Championship season of 1920 was the first held after the end of the First World War. With the football championships still not organised at national level in the newly formed Kingdom of Serbs, Croats and Slovenes (later renamed into Yugoslavia in 1929), the clubs from Serbia joined to play in this championship organised by the Belgrade Football Subassociation.

== League ==
Pos	Team	Pld	W	D	L	GF	GA	GD	Pts
1	BSK Belgrade	4	4	0	0	17	3	+14	8
2	SK Jugoslavija	4	3	0	1	10	3	+7	6
3	BUSK	4	2	0	2	3	6	−3	4
4	Vardar Belgrade	4	1	0	3	2	7	−5	2
5	Soko Belgrade	4	0	0	4	4	17	−13	0

Source: rsssf.org

== See also ==
- 1920–21 Serbian Football Championship
- Yugoslav First League
- Serbian SuperLiga
