= 1920–21 Serbian Football Championship =

The Serbian Football Championship season of 1920–21 was the second championship organised by the Belgrade Football Subassociation after the 1920 season.

== First League (1. Razred) ==
Pos	Team	Pld	W	D	L	GF	GA	GD	Pts
1	BSK Belgrade	9	6	2	1	29	9	+20	14
2	SK Jugoslavija	9	7	0	2	21	7	+14	14
3	FK BUSK	9	3	1	5	10	16	−6	7
4	Vardar Belgrade	9	3	1	5	7	12	−5	7
5	Konkordija Belgrade	5	2	0	3	7	12	−5	4
6	Soko Belgrade	9	2	0	7	9	27	−18	4

Source: rsssf.org

== Second Leagues ==
Banat League

Participating:

- Obilić Veliki Bečkerek
- Vašaš Veliki Bečkerek
- Viktorija Veliki Bečkerek
- ŽSE Žombolj
- ŽTK Žombolj
- Šveboše Žombolj
- DSK Debeljača
- KAC Velika Kikinda

Provincial League - Župa 1

Participating:

- Vojvodina Novi Sad
- NAK Novi Sad
- NSK Zemun
- ASK Zemun
- PSK Pančevo
- RSK Ruma

Provincial League - Župa 2

Participating:

- Zora Bijeljina
- Podrinje Bijeljina
- Jedinstvo Brčko
- Sloga Brčko
- Građanski Sremska Mitrovica
- Srpski SK Sremska Mitrovica
- Sloga Šabac
- Srpski mač Valjevo

Provincial League - Župa 2

Participating:

- Jedinstvo Vranje
- Moravac Leskovac
- Jug Bogdan Prokuplje
- Zlatibor Užice
- Šumadija Kragujevac
- PSK Požarevac

== See also ==
- 1919–20 Serbian Football Championship
- Yugoslav First League
- Serbian SuperLiga
