= SK Jedinstvo Beograd =

Serbian football club from 1924 to 1945

- Full name: SK Jedinstvo Beograd
- Founded: 11 May 1924; 101 years ago
- Dissolved: 1945
- Ground: Stadion Jedinstva, Belgrade
- League: Serbian League
- 1942–43: Serbian League, 6th

SK Jedinstvo Beograd (Serbian Cyrillic: СК Јединство Београд) was a Serbian football club based in Belgrade, Kingdom of Yugoslavia.

== History ==
Jedinstvo was formed on May 11, 1924 by the merger of two Belgrade clubs, Vardar and Konkordija, both of which competed in Belgrade Subassociation League until that year. They received the field of SK Srpski mač for use from the Belgrade municipality. At first their shirts were white with purple stripes but soon afterwards they changed to fuchsia, then green, and since then they became known as "Zeleni", The Greens in Serbian. Jedinstvo became one of the most important clubs in Belgrade during the pre-1945 period, right along BSK, SK Jugoslavija and BASK.

It competed in the Yugoslav First League in the seasons 1937–38, finishing 8th, and in the season 1938–39, when it finished on 6th. Due to the reduction of the number of clubs in the league from 12 to 6, it did not participate in the 1939–40 season which was the last before the beginning of the Second World War that would lead to the creation of a separate Croatian and Serbian Championships. As result, in 1940–41 a so-called Serbian League was played with Jedinstvo finishing in 4th place.

With the intensification of the war, and the following change of regime, the club ended up being disbanded in 1945.

== Honours ==
- Belgrade Subassociation League:
  - 1938

== Notable players ==
Capped by the Yugoslavia national team:

- Aleksandar Aranđelović
- Prvoslav Dragičević
- Mija Jovanović
- Mihalj Kečkeš
- Petar Lončarević
- Milutin Pajević
- Branislav Sekulić
- Ljubiša Stefanović
- Ivan Stevović
- Slavko Šurdonja
- Aleksandar Tomašević
- (Bulgaria) Anton Kuzmanov

For all former club players with Wikipedia article, please see: Category:SK Jedinstvo Beograd players.
