= 1941 Bulgarian State Football Championship =

Bulgarian State Football Championship
- Season: 1941
- Champions: Slavia Sofia

The 1941 Bulgarian State Football Championship was the 18th edition of the Bulgarian State Football Championship, the national football competition in Bulgaria.

== Overview ==
This edition of the competition was contested by 11 teams. PFC Slavia Sofia won the championship. The 1941 season was the first A PFG season to include teams from Vardar Macedonia, Western Thrace or the parts of Greek Macedonia under Bulgarian administration during much of World War II.

== First round ==
Team 1	Agg.	Team 2	1st leg	2nd leg
FC 13 Sofia	6–0	Vladislav Varna	3–0 (w/o)	3–0 (w/o)
Tsar Krum Byala Slatina	7–1	Petar Parchevich Plovdiv	6–1	1–0
Levski Plovdiv	4–2	Hadzhi Slavchev Pavlikeni	4–1	0–1
Napredak Ruse	3–4	ZhSK Sofia	1–3	2–1
Ticha Varna	1–2	Slavia Sofia	1–2	0–0
Makedonia Skopie	2–4	Sportklub Plovdiv	2–1	0–3 (w/o)

== Quarter-finals ==
Team 1	Agg.	Team 2	1st leg	2nd leg	Play-off
Slavia Sofia	4–1	FC 13 Sofia	0–0	4–1	
Tsar Krum Byala Slatina	4–5	Levski Plovdiv	0–0	2–2	2–3^{1}
Sportklub Plovdiv	0–3	ZhSK Sofia	0–2	0–1	

- ^{1}The replay was originally finished 1–1.

== Semi-finals ==
Team 1	Agg.	Team 2	1st leg	2nd leg
Levski Plovdiv	0–5	Slavia Sofia	0–3	0–2
ZhSK Sofia	bye			

== Final ==
=== First game ===
21 September 1941

ZhSK Sofia	0–0	Slavia Sofia

Sofia

=== Second game ===
28 September 1941

Slavia Sofia	2–1	ZhSK Sofia
Filipov; Belokapov		Yordanov

Sofia
