= 1939–40 Serbian League =

Serbian League
- Season: 1939-40
- Champions: BSK

The Serbian League season of 1939–40 (Serbian: 1939/40 Српска лига / 1939/40 Srpska liga) was a league which along the Croato-Slovenian one, would form the final group of teams to participate in the 1939–40 Yugoslav Football Championship. The clubs from the Vardar Banovina, Vrbas Banovina, Zeta Banovina, Morava Banovina Drina Banovina, and Danube Banovina competed in the Serbian League.

BSK Beograd was the league champion. SK Jugoslavija and FK Slavija will be joined by the top three clubs from the Croato-Slovenian League and will play the final stage of the 1939–40 Yugoslav Football Championship. SK Zemun will be relegated from the Serbian League.

== League ==
Pos	Team	Pld	W	D	L	GF	GA	GD	Pts
1	BSK	18	15	1	2	82	17	+65	31
2	SK Jugoslavija	18	9	6	3	52	18	+34	24
3	Slavija Sarajevo	18	10	3	5	47	28	+19	23
4	Vojvodina	18	8	5	5	35	34	+1	21
5	Građanski Skoplje	18	10	1	7	33	34	−1	21
6	SK Bata Borovo	18	7	4	7	31	40	−9	18
7	Jedinstvo Beograd	18	7	2	9	31	40	−9	16
8	ŽAK Subotica	18	5	1	12	20	61	−41	11
9	BASK	18	2	6	10	19	35	−16	10
10	SK Zemun	18	1	3	14	17	63	−46	5

== See also ==
- Yugoslav First League
- Serbian Football League (1940–1944)
