= Gragjanski Skopje =

Former football club from Skopje, Macedonia

- Full name: SK Gragjanski Skopje
- Founded: 1922 (Fusion with SK Vardar 1911)
- Dissolved: Fusion 1941
- Ground: Vardar Stadium
| Home colours | Away colours |

Gragjanski Skopje (Macedonian: Гpaѓaнcки Скопје, English: FC Citizens Skopje, Serbo-Croatian: Грађански Скопље, Građanski Skoplje) was a football club from Skoplje, Yugoslavia (now Skopje, North Macedonia). The club's major achievements were the two participations in the Royal League during the period from 1923 to 1940, and playing in the Bulgarian Championship between 1941 and 1944. Between 1941 and 1947 it was called FC Makedonia. (Bulgarian: Македония; Macedonian: Македониja).

== History ==
The team was founded in 1922 under the name FC Citizens Skopje. In 1926 they fused with FC Vardar (established in 1919) and moved to Vardar's football field at the City Park. They started competing in the Royal League in the same 1926. They won several championships till 1941. In 1942, with the fusion of the clubs Gragjanski Skopje, SSK, ŽSK, Pobeda Skopje and Jug, the club FC Makedonia was established in order to be more competitive and stronger in the Bulgarian Championship and also because the Bulgarian Football Federation wanted maximum of 3 teams from the newly gained territory, which were SK Makedonia, SK Bitola and SK Prilep. In 1947, after the territory of Vardar Macedonia was freed up from the Bulgarian forces, FC Makedonia fused with FK Pobeda Skopje (FC Victory Skopje) to make an even stronger team for the newly made Yugoslav Federal 1st League. At the cinema Vardar in Skopje, in order to follow the tradition, FC Vardar was re-established. FC Vardar remained one of the top clubs in the Macedonian league.

Gragjanski was the most successful and the only club to participate in the Royal League from Vardar Banovina in the period between 1923 until the WWII.

Initially it competed within the Belgrade Football Subassociation, one of the Subassociations of the Football Association of Yugoslavia, until 1927 when it became one of the founding members of the Skoplje Football Subassociation (Vardar Football League). The Subassociations were responsible for organizing leagues, corresponding to the second or third tiers, depending on the exact period. After 1927 Gragjanski played mostly in the First Division of the BSL League having become MLF champion in 1936, 1938 and 1939. After this last title, as the Yugoslav league system was being modified drastically, Gragjanski qualified directly to the Belgrade Football Sub association. This league, along with the Croato-Slovenian League, were now the two leagues forming the Royal Championship, and the winners of each one of them will dispute the Championship title. In 1937 it was adopted that the clubs playing in the top league (or leagues as in this case) will no longer play simultaneously in the Sub association leagues as well, so Gragjanski became completely focused on the Serbian League, and it paid-off, as the club made an impressive season by finishing 5th in the league, only 3 points behind the second placed team, SK Jugoslavija.

Gragjanski was the only club from Vardar Banovina to compete in the Belgrade Football Subassociation, and while SSK Skopje took the opportunity to take advantage in the BFS First Division to win titles and thus play in the qualifiers, it always failed to pass and join Gragjanski in the highest league, thus indicating the difference in quality that existed at this time between Gragjanski and the rest of the clubs which competed only in the Skopje Subassociation (SLP).

However, the exhibition from the season earlier was hard to repeat in the Belgrade Football Sub association, and Gragjanski finished 8th out of 10 clubs. It came to be the last season before the beginning of the war.

The club transformed in 1941, at the beginning of World War II and the German invasion. Most of the region was annexed by Bulgaria and another part by Italy. Officially, the area was called then Vardar Banovina, because the very name Macedonia was prohibited in the Kingdom of Yugoslavia. Most of the players of Gragjanski just as their coach Illes Spitz joined the Makedonia team, a newly formed Bulgarian merge of several previously existing clubs in Skopje: Gragjanski, SSK (Skopski sport klub), ŽSK, Pobeda and Jug. The club competed in the Bulgarian Championship between 1941 and 1944 and finished second in 1942, losing the final against Levski.

After the end of the war the national team competed in 1945 championship. In 1946, it joined the Macedonian First League, winning the championship. In 1947, the club was merged with Pobeda (Victoria Skopje) and was transformed to FK Vardar again, which went on to be the most successful club from Macedonia within the Yugoslav First League.

== Accomplishments ==
- SFS Macedonian Football league:
  - 1928'1929'1936'1937'1938
- Macedonian Republic League:
  - 1945'1946'1947

== Royal League ==
Gragjanski became a regular participant in the Yugoslav top flight during the second half of the 1930s.

- 1935–36 (Cup system):
  - 1/8 Finals: Gragjanski Skopje – Građanski Niš (home: 4–0; away: 1–2 )
  - 1/4 Finals: Gragjanski Skopje – Slavija Sarajevo (home: 2–1; away: 1–10 )
- 1938–39 (League system):
  - 10th place among 12 teams, 16 points from 22 matches; 7 wins; 2 draws; 13 losses; goal difference of 31–57.
- Belgrade Football Sub association (League system)
  - 5th place among 10 teams, 21 points from 18 matches; 10 wins; 1 draw; 7 losses; goal difference of 33–34.
- Belgrade Football Sub association (League system)
  - 8th place among 10 teams, 14 points from 17 matches; 5 wins; 4 draws; 8 losses; goals difference of 24–37.

== Team Makedonia ==
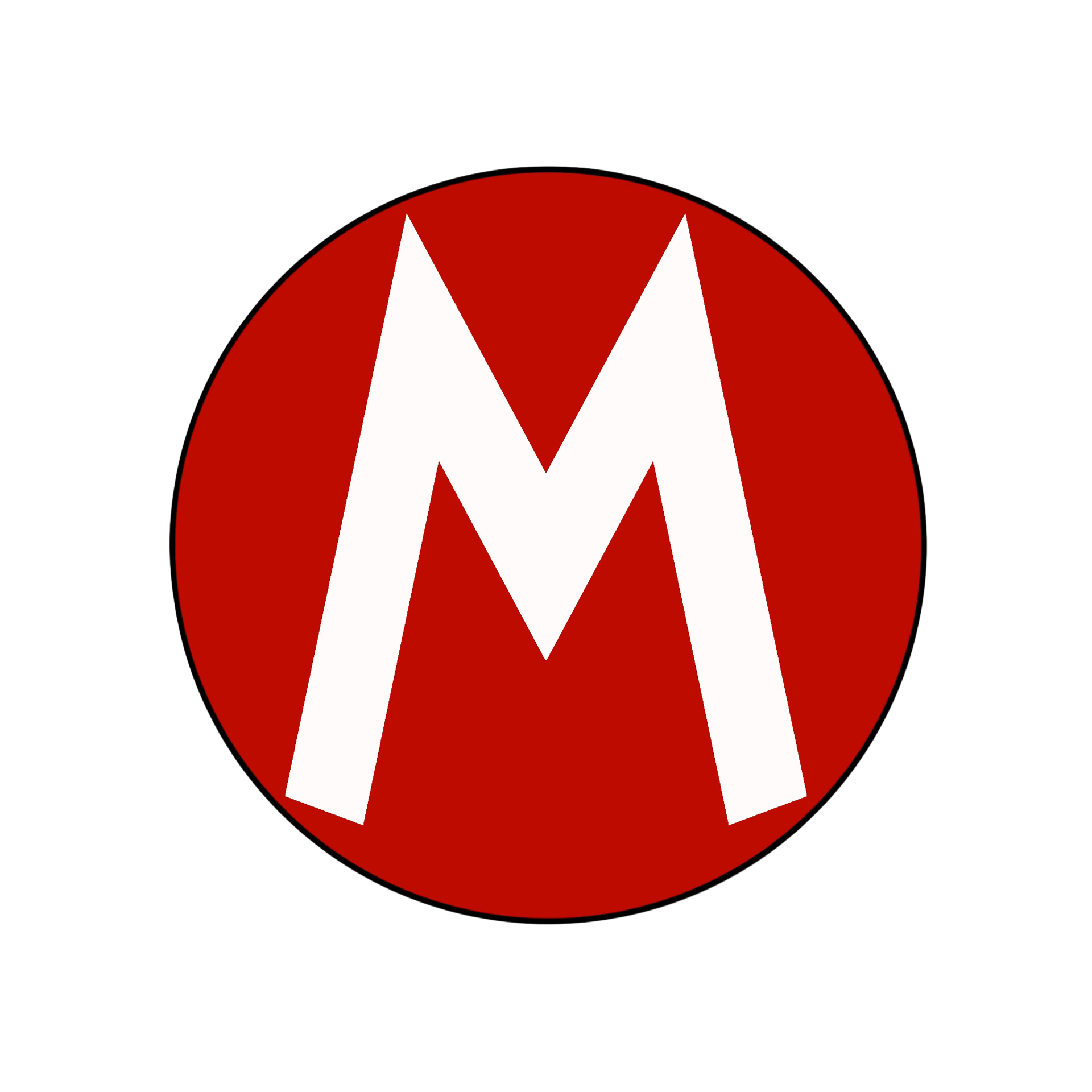
The Crest of Team Makedonia

== Players ==
- Kiril Simonovski – played as a left defender for Gragjanski and FC Macedonia in the period 1938–1945 having afterwards played for Partizan Belgrade until 1950 where he won two national championships and one cup. After retiring, he became a notable coach having worked mostly with top league clubs in Yugoslavia and Greece. In 1942 he played 2 matches for Bulgaria, and between 1946 and 1947 he played 10 matches having scored once for Yugoslavia.
- During the period of World War II, the Bulgarian national team selected several players from the club, namely Kiril Simonovski (named Kiril Simeonov at that period), Todor Atanaskov, Stoyan Bogoev, Atanas Lukov, Blagoy Simeonov, Bogdan Vidov and Lyuben Yanev. These players played in the Yugoslav league before 1941 as Kiril and Blagoje Simonović, Svetozar Atanacković, Stojan Bogojević, Atanas Luković, Bogdan Vidović and Ljuban Janević. Some players after the WWII changed their surnames in accordance with the new SR Macedonia's legislation: Simonovski, Atanasovski, Bogoevski, Lukovski, Vidovski, Janevski, etc.

== Coaches ==
List of coaches:

- (Kingdom of Yugoslavia) Dragan Stanishik (x – 1935)
- (Kingdom of Yugoslavia) Vladimir Kujundjik (1936 – 1938)
- (Kingdom of Yugoslavia) Dushan Markovik (1938 – 1939)
- (Hungary) Illes Spitz (1939 – 1946)

== External sources ==
- Građanski Skopje at fkvojvodina.com (in Serbian)
