= 1942 Bulgarian State Football Championship =

Bulgarian State Football Championship
- Season: 1942
- Champions: Levski Sofia

The 1942 Bulgarian State Football Championship was the 18th season of the Bulgarian State Football Championship.

Defending champions were Slavia Sofia. It was contested by 22 teams, and Levski Sofia won the championship, as well as its first domestic double. Besides teams from the present borders of Bulgaria, the 1942 edition of the competition also involved teams from the areas under Bulgarian administration during much of World War II. The football clubs from Prilep, Bitola and Skopje in Vardar Macedonia took part in the competition, with Makedonia Skopie even reaching the final.

== First round ==
Team 1	Score	Team 2
Ticha Varna	4–0	Tsar Boris III Dobrich
Han Kubrat Popovo	1–2	Pobeda Varna
Knyaginya Maria Luisa Lom	3–1	Botev Sofia
Atletik Dupnitsa	1–0	Knyaz Kiril Preslavski Sofia
Botev Plovdiv	2–5	Levski Sofia
Botev Haskovo	1–4	Sportklub Plovdiv
SP 39 Pleven	0–1	ZhSK Sofia
Slavia Sofia	6–0	Georgi Drazhev Yambol
ZhSK Skopie	8–0	Gotse Delchev Prilep
Makedonia Bitolya	4–1	Vardar Skopie
ZhSK Ruse	bye	
Makedonia Skopie	bye	

== Second round ==
Team 1	Score	Team 2
Slavia Sofia	1–0	Makedonia Bitolya
Ticha Varna	4–0	ZhSK Ruse
ZhSK Sofia	3–0 (w/o)	ZhSK Skopie
Levski Sofia	5–2	Atletik Dupnitsa
Sportklub Plovdiv	0–2	Makedonia Skopie
Pobeda Varna	4–0	Knyaginya Maria Luisa Lom

== Quarter-finals ==
Team 1	Agg.	Team 2	1st leg	2nd leg	Play-off
Levski Sofia	6–0	Ticha Varna	4–0	2–0	
Pobeda Varna	2–4	Slavia Sofia	1–1	0–0 (a.e.t.)	1–3
Makedonia Skopie	6–1	ZhSK Sofia	3–1	3–0 (w/o)	

== Semi-finals ==
Team 1	Agg.	Team 2	1st leg	2nd leg
Makedonia Skopie	5–4	Slavia Sofia	5–1	0–3
Levski Sofia	bye			

== Final ==
=== First game ===
11 October 1942

Makedonia Skopie	0–2	Levski Sofia
		Laskov

Skopje

=== Second game ===
18 October 1942

Levski Sofia	1–0	Makedonia Skopie
Laskov

Sofia

Levski Sofia won 3–0 on aggregate.
