= Gustav Lechner =

Croatian footballer

Personal information
- Date of birth: 17 February 1913
- Place of birth: Osijek, Austria-Hungary
- Date of death: 5 February 1987 (aged 73)
- Place of death: Zagreb, SFR Yugoslavia
- Position: Midfielder

Senior career*
Years	Team	Apps	(Gls)
1930–1935	Slavija Osijek	40	(0)
1935–1940	BSK	70	(0)
1941–1945	Građanski Zagreb		
1945–1949	Proleter Osijek		

International career
1931–1940	Yugoslavia	44	(0)
1941–1944	Croatia	12	(0)

Managerial career
- 1945–1949: Proleter Osijek (player-manager)
- Metalac Osijek
- Dinamo Pančevo
- 1953–1957: Vojvodina
- 1957–1958: Dinamo Zagreb
- 1959–1960: Velež
- Slavonija Požega
- 196x–1966: NK Zagreb
- * Club domestic league appearances and goals

Gustav Lechner (17 February 1913 – 5 February 1987) was a football player and coach. At international level he represented both Yugoslavia and Croatia.

== Club career ==
Born in Osijek, Austria-Hungary and nicknamed Lembika, he spent his early career with Slavija Osijek and BSK; while playing with the latter he won 3 Yugoslav titles and graduated from law school. In 1941 he and teammate Ernest Dubac joined Građanski Zagreb. At the end of the war, he became player-manager of Proleter Osijek.

== International career ==
Lechner made his debut for Yugoslavia in an August 1931 friendly match against Czechoslovakia and earned a total of 44 caps scoring no goals. He then played 12 matches under the flag of the Independent State of Croatia, a World War II-era puppet state of Nazi Germany. His final international was an April 1944 friendly against Slovakia.

== Coaching career ==
After retiring as a player in 1949, Lechner became a coach and managed Metalac Osijek, Dinamo Pančevo, Vojvodina Novi Sad, Dinamo Zagreb, Velež Mostar, Slavonija Požega and NK Zagreb.

== Death ==
Lechner died on 5 February 1987 in Zagreb, and was buried on 11 February at the Saint Anne Cemetery in his hometown of Osijek.
