= Skoplje Football Subassociation =

Regional football governing body in North Macedonia

The Skoplje Football Subassociation (Serbo-Croatian: Skopski loptački podsavez / Скопски лоптачки подсавез) was one of the regional football governing bodies under the tutorial of the Football Association of Yugoslavia. It was formed on 18 December 1926 . By the time of its formation it included the clubs from the districts of Skopje, Bregalnica, Bitola, Kosovo and Vranje. It was one of the Football Subassociations which formed the football league system in the Kingdom of Yugoslavia.

== History ==
The founding general assembly was held on December 18, 1926, in a restaurant Neznani junak in Skopje where the delegates from all of what was known back then as Southern Serbia were present. Special envoys of the Football Association of Yugoslavia came from Belgrade, Vladimir Zakić and Bora Jovanović, who were also both members of the Belgrade Subassociation. At the assembly there were also 21 delegates representing 21 clubs: 7 from Leskovac, 6 from Skoplje, 6 from Bitola, 1 from Vranje and 1 from Strumica. The newly formed subassociation will be in charge of supervising the football competition of the around 26 clubs found in the geographical area located southern of Leskovac.

The subassociation of Skopje counted 27 clubs in 1929. In 1940 the number of clubs has raised to 48 and there were 23 football stadiums or fields.

The presidents of the SLP were Đorđe Ristić (1927-1930), Kosta Trnjajski (1930-1934) and Stevan Trivunac (1934-1941).

== SLP First Division ==
The Skoplje Football Subassociation (SLP) was the organiser of the league which will be one among the other Yugoslav Football Subassociation leagues which formed the Yugoslav league system. During the 1920s the First Division of the Skoplje Subassociation would be ranked as the second national tier, just as all the other First Divisions of all Subassociations, as the champion of the First Division would have access to the national top-flight league, the Yugoslav Championship. Although only the winners of Belgrade and Zagreb Subassociations would have direct access to the national championship, all the other subassociation champions, including Skopje one, would have to play a qualifying round. Later during the 1930s the national league was expanded, and an intermediate stage was set where the best qualified teams from all the subassociations would play a group stage in order to qualify for the Yugoslav Championship.

=== Seasons and champions ===
Before Subdivission League was established from 1921 till 1927,they played Sub districts and district leagues. This is the list of seasons indicating the league champions. Whenever the second placed team is also included, it meant that the club also participated in the Yugoslav Championship qualifiers as on some seasons two clubs qualified.

| Years | Champions | Classification | |
|---|---|---|---|
| 1921-22 | SK Vardar 1911 | Sub Districts | Teams: SSK, Dushan Silni Prizren, Napredok Skopje, Sveti Nikola,Babunski Veles, SK Vardar 1911 |
| 1922-23 | SK Vardar 1911 | Skopje district league | Teams: Napredok, SSK, Pobeda, SK Vardar 1911, Makedonija Skopje, Gragjanski |
| 1923-24 | Napredok Skopje | Skopje district league | Napredok 12, SK Vardar 1911 5, Gragjanski 4, Pobeda Skopje 3, SSK retreat |
| 1923-24 | Napredok Skopje | Final | Napredok Skopje – FK Belasica n.d. |
| 1924-25 | SSK Skopje | Skopje District League | SSK 20, Napredok 19, Pobeda 12, Gragjanski 11, Olimpija 5, Singelich 3, Rapid 0 |
| 1924-25 | SSK Skopje | Sub Districts | Final: FK Kumanovo – FK Ljuboten 9–1 |
| 1924-25 | SSK Skopje | Final | SSK Skopje – FK Kumanovo 4–2 |
| 1925-26 | SK Bitola | Skopje district league | SSK Skopje 19, Gragjanski 13, Pobeda 11, Olimpija 11, Rapid 6, Balkan 0 |
| 1925-26 | SK Bitola | Bitola district league | SK Bitola 6, Balkan Bitola 3, Makedonija Bitola 3, Jugoslavija Prilep 0 |
| 1925-26 | SK Bitola | Final | SK Bitola – SSK Skopje n.d. |
| 1926-27 | Pobeda | Skopje district league | Pobeda 9, SSK 8, Gragjanski 6, Sparta 4, Babunski Veles 5, FK Belasica 1 |
| 1926-27 | Pobeda | Bitola district league | SK Bitola 14, Balkan Bitola 9, Makedonija Bitola 5, Hajduk Bitola 2, Edinstvo Bitola 0 |
| 1926-27 | Pobeda | Final | Pobeda – SK Bitola 4–0 |

== Subdivission League ==
- 1928: Pobeda Skopje

| Pos. | Teams | Pt | G | W | D | L | Gsc | GS | GD |
|---|---|---|---|---|---|---|---|---|---|
| 1. | Pobeda Skopje | 11 | 8 | 4 | 3 | 1 | 20 | 10 | + 10 |
| 2. | Gragjanski Skopje | 10 | 8 | 5 | 0 | 3 | 22 | 11 | +9 |
| 3. | SSK Skopje | 9 | 8 | 4 | 1 | 3 | 17 | 21 | -4 |
| 4. | FK Sparta Skopje | 7 | 8 | 3 | 1 | 4 | 13 | 19 | -6 |
| 5. | FK Kumanovo | 3 | 8 | 1 | 1 | 6 | 9 | 22 | -13 |
| 6. | Babunski Veles | Retreat | | | | | | | |
Font: exyufudbal

- 1929: Pobeda Skopje

| Pos. | Teams | Pt | G | W | D | L | Gsc | GS | GD |
|---|---|---|---|---|---|---|---|---|---|
| 1. | Pobeda Skopje | 11 | 6 | 5 | 1 | 0 | 18 | 9 | +9 |
| 2. | Gragjanski Skopje | 10 | 7 | 5 | 0 | 2 | 25 | 10 | +15 |
| 3. | FK Kumanovo | 7 | 6 | 3 | 1 | 2 | 18 | 10 | +8 |
| 4. | Sparta Skopje | 4 | 7 | 1 | 2 | 4 | 7 | 21 | -14 |
| 5. | Jug Skopje | 2 | 8 | 0 | 2 | 6 | 7 | 25 | -18 |
Font: exyufudbal

- 1930: Note: Jug Skopje, SSK Skopje and Sparta Skopje finish the season with equal number of points with the rules dictating that the goal difference should indicate the champion in these cases. However, due to irregularities during the autumn part of the season, the SLP was unable to declare a winner and failed to send a representative to the national championship qualifiers.

| Pos. | Team | Pt | G | W | D | L | Gsc | GS | GD |
|---|---|---|---|---|---|---|---|---|---|
| 1. | SSK Skopje | 12 | 8 | 6 | 0 | 2 | 55 | 11 | +44 |
| 2. | Jug Skopje | 12 | 8 | 6 | 0 | 2 | 33 | 8 | +25 |
| 3. | Sparta Skopje | 12 | 8 | 6 | 0 | 2 | 19 | 14 | +5 |
| 4. | Vardar Skopje | 2 | 8 | 0 | 2 | 6 | 7 | 41 | -34 |
| 5. | Jugović Skopje | 2 | 8 | 0 | 2 | 6 | 4 | 44 | -40 |
Fonte: exyufudbal

- 1931: The season was not finished as the entire national league system modified.

| Pos. | Team | Pt | G | W | D | L | Gsc | GS | GD |
|---|---|---|---|---|---|---|---|---|---|
| 1. | Jug Skopje | 8 | 4 | 4 | 0 | 0 | 15 | 5 | +10 |
| 2. | SSK Skopje | 5 | 4 | 2 | 1 | 1 | 9 | 7 | +2 |
| 3. | Sparta Skopje | 4 | 6 | 1 | 2 | 3 | 10 | 10 | 0 |
| 4. | Vardar Skopje | 1 | 4 | 0 | 1 | 3 | 2 | 11 | -9 |
| 5. | Jugović Skopje | Under disqualification and then ceased activity | | | | | | | |
Font: exyufudbal

- 1932: SSK Skopje (second placed Gragjanski Skopje also participated in the play-offs)

| Pos. | Teams | Pt | G | W | D | P | Gsc | GS | GD |
|---|---|---|---|---|---|---|---|---|---|
| 1. | SSK Skopje | 17 | 10 | 7 | 3 | 0 | 38 | 7 | +31 |
| 2. | Gragjanski Skopje | 16 | 10 | 7 | 2 | 1 | 37 | 10 | +36 |
| 3. | Jug Skopje | 15 | 10 | 7 | 1 | 2 | 48 | 14 | + 34 |
| 4. | Sparta Skopje | 8 | 10 | 4 | 0 | 6 | 12 | 24 | -12 |
| 5. | Hajduk Skopje | 4 | 10 | 2 | 0 | 8 | 20 | 36 | -16 |
| 6. | Vardar Skopje | 0 | 10 | 0 | 0 | 10 | 1 | 65 | -64 |
Font: exyufudbal

- 1933: SSK Skopje

| Pos. | Teams | Pt | G | W | D | L | Gsc | GS | GD |
|---|---|---|---|---|---|---|---|---|---|
| 1. | SSK Skopje | 16 | 10 | 7 | 2 | 1 | 22 | 8 | +14 |
| 2. | Gragjanski Skopje | 14 | 10 | 6 | 2 | 2 | 26 | 10 | +16 |
| 3. | Jug Skopje | 9 | 10 | 4 | 1 | 5 | 25 | 16 | +9 |
| 4. | Hajduk Skopje | 8 | 10 | 4 | 2 | 4 | 19 | 18 | +1 |
| 5. | FK Slavija | 7 | 9 | 3 | 1 | 5 | 13 | 26 | -13 |
| 6. | Sparta Skopje | 2 | 9 | 0 | 2 | 7 | 5 | 32 | -27 |
Font: exyufudbal

- 1934: SSK Skopje

| Pos. | teams | Pt | G | W | D | P | Gsc | GS | GD |
|---|---|---|---|---|---|---|---|---|---|
| 1. | SSK Skopje | 19 | 14 | 9 | 1 | 4 | 40 | 22 | +18 |
| 2. | Hajduk Skopje | 17 | 14 | 7 | 3 | 4 | 22 | 18 | +4 |
| 3. | Gragjanski Skopje | 15 | 14 | 7 | 1 | 6 | 27 | 23 | +4 |
| 4. | Slavija Skopje | 15 | 14 | 7 | 1 | 6 | 26 | 25 | + 1 |
| 5. | Jug Skopje | 14 | 14 | 7 | 0 | 7 | 29 | 25 | +4 |
| 6. | Sparta Skopje | 14 | 14 | 7 | 0 | 7 | 26 | 27 | +1 |
| 7. | Crna Gora Skopje | 13 | 14 | 5 | 3 | 6 | 22 | 15 | +7 |
| 8. | Vardar Skopje | 5 | 14 | 2 | 1 | 11 | 13 | 50 | -37 |
Font: exyufudbal

- 1935:

| Pos. | Teams | Pt | G | W | D | P | Gsc | GS | GD |
|---|---|---|---|---|---|---|---|---|---|
| 1. | Slavija Skopje | 10 | 8 | 4 | 2 | 2 | 27 | 15 | +12 |
| 2. | Jug Skopje | 9 | 8 | 3 | 3 | 2 | 14 | 11 | +3 |
| 3. | Hajduk Skopje | 8 | 8 | 3 | 2 | 3 | 17 | 18 | -1 |
| 4. | Gragjanski Skopje | 7 | 8 | 3 | 1 | 4 | 12 | 19 | -7 |
| 5. | SSK Skopje | 6 | 8 | 2 | 2 | 4 | 15 | 22 | -7 |
Font: exyufudbal

- 1936: Gragjanski Skopje

| Pos. | Teams | Pt | G | W | D | L | Gsc | GS | GD |
|---|---|---|---|---|---|---|---|---|---|
| 1. | Gragjanski Skopje | 15 | 10 | 6 | 3 | 1 | 25 | 9 | +16 |
| 2. | SSK Skopje | 15 | 10 | 7 | 1 | 2 | 18 | 11 | +7 |
| 3. | Slavija Skopje | 12 | 10 | 5 | 2 | 3 | 27 | 12 | +15 |
| 4. | Jug Skopje | 10 | 10 | 4 | 2 | 4 | 20 | 11 | +9 |
| 5. | Hajduk Skopje | 8 | 10 | 4 | 0 | 6 | 11 | 26 | -15 |
| 6. | Sparta Skopje | 2 | 10 | 1 | 0 | 9 | 10 | 37 | -26 |
Font: exyufudbal

- 1937: Note: It was adopted a system where the clubs competing in the national championship do not compete at subassociation level as well.

| Pos. | Teams | Pt | G | W | D | L | Gsc | GS | GD |
|---|---|---|---|---|---|---|---|---|---|
| 1. | Gragjanski Skopje | 20 | 10 | 10 | 0 | 0 | 44 | 15 | + 29 |
| 2. | Slavija Skopje | 15 | 10 | 7 | 1 | 2 | 22 | 10 | +12 |
| 3. | Jug Skopje | 11 | 10 | 5 | 1 | 4 | 21 | 15 | +6 |
| 4. | Hajduk Skopje | 10 | 10 | 3 | 1 | 6 | 10 | 30 | -20 |
| 5. | SSK Skopje | 5 | 10 | 2 | 1 | 7 | 19 | 30 | -11 |
| 6. | Vardar Skopje | 2 | 10 | 1 | 0 | 9 | 16 | 32 | -16 |
Font: exyufudbal

- 1938: Gragjanski Skopje

| Pos. | Teams | Pt | G | W | D | P | Gsc | GS | GD |
|---|---|---|---|---|---|---|---|---|---|
| 1. | Gragjanski Skopje | 18 | 10 | 9 | 0 | 1 | 52 | 8 | +44 |
| 2. | Jug Skopje | 16 | 10 | 8 | 0 | 2 | 42 | 13 | +29 |
| 3. | SSK Skopje | 13 | 10 | 6 | 1 | 3 | 32 | 21 | +11 |
| 4. | Sparta Skopje | 8 | 10 | 3 | 2 | 5 | 20 | 38 | -18 |
| 5. | Hajduk Skopje | 3 | 10 | 1 | 1 | 8 | 20 | 43 | -23 |
| 6. | Vardar Skopje | 2 | 10 | 0 | 2 | 8 | 14 | 47 | -33 |
Font: exyufudbal

- 1939: Gragjanski Skopje

| Pos. | Teams | Pt | G | W | D | L | Gsc | GS | GD |
|---|---|---|---|---|---|---|---|---|---|
| 1. | SSK Skopje | 19 | 10 | 9 | 1 | 0 | 33 | 6 | +27 |
| 2. | Jug Skopje | 17 | 10 | 8 | 1 | 1 | 47 | 8 | +39 |
| 3. | Vardar Skopje | 10 | 10 | 5 | 0 | 5 | 30 | 23 | +7 |
| 4. | Hajduk Skopje | 6 | 10 | 3 | 0 | 7 | 25 | 29 | -4 |
| 5. | Sparta Skopje | 6 | 10 | 3 | 0 | 7 | 18 | 34 | -16 |
| 6. | FK Balkan Skopje | 2 | 10 | 1 | 0 | 9 | 12 | 65 | -53 |
Font: exyufudbal

- 1940: SSK Skopje

| Pos. | Teams | Pt | G | W | D | L | Gsc | GS | GD |
|---|---|---|---|---|---|---|---|---|---|
| 1. | SSK Skopje | 19 | 10 | 9 | 1 | 0 | 54 | 14 | +40 |
| 2. | Jug Skopje | 14 | 10 | 6 | 0 | 4 | 34 | 14 | +20 |
| 3. | Hajduk Skopje | 10 | 10 | 4 | 2 | 4 | 24 | 29 | -5 |
| 4. | Vardar Skopje | 10 | 10 | 4 | 2 | 4 | 19 | 30 | -11 |
| 5. | Olimpija Skopje | 5 | 10 | 2 | 1 | 7 | 13 | 29 | -16 |
| 6. | Sparta Skopje | 4 | 10 | 1 | 2 | 7 | 9 | 37 | -28 |
Font: exyufudbal

- 1941: SSK Skopje

In 1940 SSK Skopje plays as SLP champion the qualifiers to the Yugoslav Championship. It plays in the Group 2. In skips the first round and in the second eliminates Borac Petrograd (6:0, 0:2), then in the third round it is eliminated by FK Vojvodina (2:2, 1:4), however due to the restructuring of the league and the formation of two separate leagues, the Serbian and the Croato-Slovenian, SSK Skopje gets the chance to play the qualifiers to the Serbian League, however it fails to qualify as in the first round they lost against Balšić Podgorica (1:2, 0:1). The curiosity is that Gragjanski Skopje, because of having been part in the Yugoslav Championship in the previous season, got direct qualification into the Serbian League, having finished 5th, 10 points behind the winner BSK Belgrade, but only 3 points behind SK Jugoslavija who finished in second place.

In 1941 SSK Skopje won the SLP booking that way their place in the qualifiers for the 1940–41 Serbian League. After winning in the first round Železničar Niš (2:1), in the second they made an impressive result against Jedinstvo Čačak (9:3, 1:1) however they surprisingly lost against Jugoslavija Jabuka (2:4, 2:4). Gragjanski Skopje by having finished in 5th place in the previous season had a guaranteed spot in the League however this year the results were not that impressive with the team finishing 8th among 10 teams.
