= Football Association of Yugoslavia =

Association football governing body in Yugoslavia

UEFA
- Founded: 18 April 1919
- Folded: February 2003
- Headquarters: Zagreb (1919–1930); Belgrade (1930–2003)
- FIFA affiliation: 4 May 1921 (temporary); 20 May 1923 (permanent)
- UEFA affiliation: June 1954

The Football Association of Yugoslavia (FSJ; Serbian: Фудбалски савез Југославије, romanized: Fudbalski savez Jugoslavije, Croatian: Jugoslavenski nogometni savez; Slovene: Nogometna zveza Jugoslavije; Macedonian: Фудбалски сојуз на Југославија, romanized: Fudbalski Sojuz na Jugoslavija) was the governing body of football in Yugoslavia, based in Belgrade, with a major administrative branch in Zagreb.

It organized the Yugoslav First League, the Yugoslavia national football team, and the Second Leagues of all six former Yugoslav republics.

== History ==
It was formed in April 1919 in Zagreb under the name Jugoslavenski nogometni savez. The FA became the temporary member of FIFA on 4 May 1921 and permanent member on 20 May 1923. The name later changed to Nogometni savez Jugoslavije. After disagreements between the Zagreb and Belgrade subassociations in 1929, the Assembly of Football Association of Yugoslavia was dissolved in 1929, subsequently with the 6 January Dictatorship; the association headquarters moved to Belgrade next year, on 16 March 1930 where the organization modified its name to Fudbalski Savez Jugoslavije.

During this time there were several subassociations which organized football on the regional level. These were:

- Banja Luka Football Subassociation
- Belgrade Football Subassociation (12 March 1920)
- Cetinje Football Subassociation (8 March 1931)
- Kragujevac Football Subassociation (15 April 1932)
- Ljubljana Football Subassociation (23 April 1920)
- Niš Football Subassociation (8 March 1931)
- Novi Sad Football Subassociation (13 April 1930)
- Osijek Football Subassociation (16 March 1924)
- Sarajevo Football Subassociation (1920/1921)
- Skoplje Football Subassociation (18 December 1927)
- Split Football Subassociation (7 March 1920)
- Subotica Football Subassociation (3 March 1920)
- Sušak Football Subassociation (early 1940)
- Veliki Bečkerek Football Subassociation (11 May 1930)
- Zagreb Football Subassociation (8 September 1919)

On 1 October 1939, the association was reestablished as the Supreme Football Association of Yugoslavia (Vrhovni nogometni savez Jugoslavije), which was made up of the associations: the Slovenian Football Federation (Slovenska nogometna zveza) covering the Drava Banovina, the Croatian Football Federation (Hrvatski nogometni savez) covering the Banovina of Croatia, and the Serbian Football Federation (Srpski loptački savez) covering the remainder of the state. This new created association is formed new subassociation: Sušak Football Subassociation (January 1940) and Maribor and Celje Football Subassociation (in late 1940). In 1954 Football Association of Yugoslavia became the member of UEFA.

The logo used after the breakup of Yugoslavia.

In 1992, the SFR Yugoslavia dissolved, but the republics of Serbia and Montenegro reconstituted a union under the name FR Yugoslavia, claiming the succession of the former Yugoslavia exclusively for themselves, including the football association, so they kept the football association along with its membership in FIFA and UEFA. The Football Association of Yugoslavia was replaced by the Football Association of Serbia and Montenegro in 2003, when the nation changed its name to Serbia and Montenegro.

== List of presidents ==
- Hinko Würth (1919–1920)
- Ante Jakovac (1920–1921)
- Ivo Lipovšćak (1921–1923)
- Miroslav Petanjek (1923)
- Veljko Ugrinić (1923–1924)
- Hinko Würth (1924)
- Kazimir Kremedić (1924–1925)
- Ivo Lipovšćak (1925–1927)
- Dragan Vučković (1927)
- Ljubomir Dermakis (1927)
- Vatroslav Krčelić (1927–1928) (interim)
- Ante Pandaković (1928–1930)
- Janko Šafarik (1930–1931)
- Zarija Marković (1931–1932)
- Božidar Todorović (1932–1934)
- Miodrag Filipović (1934–1935)
- Ljubomir Radovanović (1935–1937)
- Mihajlo Andrejević (1937–1941)
- Milorad Arsenijević (1946–1948)
- Ratomir Dugonjić (1948–1951)
- Veljko Zeković (1951–1952)
- Dragomir Nikolić (1952–1953)
- Ratomir Dugonjić (1953)
- Branko Pešić (1953–1955)
- Ratomir Dugonjić (1955–1956)
- Branko Pešić (1956–1957)
- Dušan Đurđić (1957–1964)
- Aleksandar Jovančević (1964–1965) (interim)
- Boško Baškot (1965–1967)
- Dragoljub Kirčanski (1967–1971)
- Luka Bajakić (1971–1973)
- Pavle Davkov (1973–1974)
- Pero Korobar (1974–1976)
- Tone Florjančič (1976–1978)
- Ševćet Mustafa (1978–1980)
- Dimo Hanović (1980) (interim)
- Milan Brajević (1980–1981)
- Tomaš Tomašević (1981–1982)
- Draško Popović (1982–1984)
- Janko Pejanović (1984–1986)
- Slavko Šajber (1986–1987)
- Antun Čilić (1987–1988)
- Tomislav Filipovski (1988–1990)
- Marko Ilešič (1990–1991)

== Football associations of successor countries ==
- Croatian Football Federation - 1912
- Football Association of Serbia - 1919/2006 (autonomous Football Association of Vojvodina, 1949.)
- Football Association of Slovenia - 1920
- Football Federation of Kosovo - 1946
- Football Association of Montenegro - 1931
- Football Federation of North Macedonia - 1949
- Football Association of Bosnia and Herzegovina - 1920/1992
- Football Association of Serbia and Montenegro - 1992
