= 1940–41 Serbian League =

Serbian League
- Season: 1940-41
- Champions: BSK

The 1940–41 Serbian League (Serbian: 1940–41 Српска лига / 1940–41 Srpska liga) was first held after the formation of the Banovina of Croatia and the consequent withdrawal of Croatian and Slovenian based clubs from the Yugoslav First League. As a consequence, the clubs from the Vardar Banovina, Vrbas Banovina, Zeta Banovina, Morava Banovina Drina Banovina, and Danube Banovina competed together.

BSK was the league leader when the April War interrupted play. The league was organized by the Serbian Football Federation (Srpski loptački savez).

== League ==
Pos	Team	Pld	W	D	L	GF	GA	GD	Pts
1	BSK	18	15	2	1	63	17	+46	32
2	Jugoslavija Belgrade	18	11	4	3	41	21	+20	26
3	Vojvodina	18	7	5	6	36	28	+8	19
4	Jedinstvo Belgrade	17	8	2	7	20	21	−1	18
5	ŽAK Subotica	18	7	4	7	32	42	−10	18
6	Bata Borovo	17	8	1	8	38	32	+6	17
7	Jugoslavija Jabuka	18	7	2	9	27	41	−14	16
8	Građanski Skoplje	17	5	4	8	24	37	−13	14
9	Slavija Sarajevo	18	2	6	10	34	41	−7	10
10	BASK	17	1	4	12	21	56	−35	6

Source: rsssf.org

== See also ==
- Yugoslav First League
- 1940–41 Croatian First League
- 1940–41 Slovenian Republic League
- Serbian SuperLiga
- Serbian Football Championship
- Serbian Football League (1940–1944)
