= Belgrade Football Subassociation =

The Belgrade Football Subassociation, commonly known by its initials, BLP (Serbo-Croato-Slovenian: Beogradski loptački podsavez / Београдски лоптачки подсавез - БЛП) was one of the regional football governing bodies under the tutorial of the Football Association of Yugoslavia. It was formed on 12 March 1920, and included the clubs from the geographical territories of Vojvodina, Central Serbia, Old Serbia (Kosovo) and South Serbia (Macedonia). The increase of number of clubs made that progressively other subassociations become formed by separating them from Belgrade's one. By 1932 its territory included beside Belgrade metropolitan area only the districts of Kolubara, Braničevo, Podunavlje and Jasenica-Kosmaj.

Its main role was to organise and control the league competition which consisted in interconnected leagues in a hierarchical format with promotion and relegation between leagues at different levels.

At the top of the hierarchy was the First Division of the BLP (1. razred BLP / 1. разред БПЛ), often known simply as Belgrade Football Subassociation League and the winner had direct access to the Yugoslav Championship while the second placed had to play a qualifying round. The Second and Third Divisions were divided in groups.

== History ==
Before the formation of the BLP, football clubs in Serbia lacked an organised competition and limited to play friendly or exhibition matches. Occasionally, tournaments were organised in major urban centers. Football was characterised as an amateur leisure activity. The formation of BLP joined a number of willingfull and passionate people who will improve the management and organisation of football in Serbia, turning it into a more developed and professionalised activity. This greatly contributed for the mass popularisation of football and the quality gap that existed in comparison to other footballistically more developed countries started to be diminish. In a relatively brief period, football went from being a marginal students leisure activity to become the most popular sports activity in the country. The press passed from an attitude of total ignorance towards full coverage, and most important, it became subject of interest from the lowest working and peasantry classes, to the Belgrade high society, with the royal family itself frequently attending the most important matches.

However at beginning it was the individuals with their own initiative and good-will that mostly contributed to the development of the clubs and the competition. The first president of the BLP was Dragutin Kostić. In 1921 he is replaced by Žika Simonović. That year the subassociation counted with only 66 clubs, 19 of which in the city of Belgrade itself, 9 in the district (župa - administrative unit) of Banat, 3 in Brčko, 4 in Bijeljina, 4 in Leskovac, 3 in Vranje, 2 in Skoplje, 3 in Zemun, 1 in Šabac, 2 in Sremska Mitrovica, 2 in Užice, 1 in Požega, 1 in Jagodina, 2 in Čačak, 1 in Ruma, 1 in Negotin, 1 in Kruševac and 1 in Veles. In the third general assembly hold that year, it was decided that Politika would become the official media of the BLP. The conference from 15 January 1922 was marked by the decision to strengthen the relations with the peripheral provincial clubs, and the territory was divided among Župa's, administrative units corresponding in English language to parishes or districts.

In the general assembly held on 2 July 1922, a new administration was elected with Danilo Stojanović, popularly named as Čika Dača (Unckle Dacha) as its president. As one of the pioneers of football in Serbia and the founder of a number of clubs, he was highly regarded for that position. However, in the fourth general assembly held on 31 December 1922 the administration headed by Janko Šafarik is elected with him becoming the new president. The BLP was steadily growing and in 1923 it counted two main leagues, the First League of BLP (1. razred BLP) and Second League of BLP (2. razred BLP), and the leagues of the districts (župa's) which were 12, some counting 2 levels, a and b: Belgrade, Banat (a and b), Posavina, Bosnia, Kolubara, Šumadija, Krajina, Jelica, Morava and Skoplje.

In 1925, Mata Miodragović was elected president in a general assembly held on 17 August 1925. The assembly unilaterally declared the support for the seat of the Football Association of Yugoslavia to be moved from Zagreb to Belgrade. In 1926 Zarija Marković was elected president and will stay until 1929 when Svetislav Živković replaced him. Milan Bogdanović would be elected in 1931 and a year later Dimitrije Bojić will take his place. In 1933 Milan Bogdanović retook his position, and in 1934 Bojić succeeded him once again. This period was marked by the leadership of people well familiarised with the needs and problems of the organisation, so it is not unusual to see presidents being reelected or returning to the leadership position, as happened with Svetislav Živković who was president between 1929 and 1931 and was elected again in 1936. Jovan Spasojević, a physician by profession, took control in July 1937, and he was re-elected twice, in 1938 and 1940.

== Creation of further Subassociations ==
With the development and expansion of football, its proliferation into provincial areas, the increase of competitions and the growing number of new clubs, a number of new subassociations was created within the initial territory of the Belgrade Football Subassociation.

- The Skoplje Football Subassociation was formed on 18 December 1926 and included most of the territory which was by then known as the Southern and Old Serbia, namely the clubs from the districts of Skoplje, Bregalnica, Bitola, Kosovo and Vranje.
- The Novi Sad Football Subassociation was formed on 13 April 1930 and included the clubs from the districts of Novi Sad, Sremska Mitrovica, Ruma and Šabac.
- The Veliki Bečkerek Football Subassociation was formed on 11 May 1930 and included the clubs from the district of Banat including the municipalities of Veliki Bečkerek (city was renamed to Petrovgrad in 1935, known as Zrenjanin nowadays), Vršac, Kikinda, Novi Bečej and Pančevo.
- The Niš Football Subassociation was formed on 8 March 1931 and included much of the territory of the Morava district. Includes the clubs from the municipalities of Niš, Kruševac, Zaječar, Negotin, Bor, Knjaževac and Leskovac, which was part of the Skoplje subassociation.
- The Kragujevac Football Subassociation was formed on 20 December 1931 and included the clubs from the former province of Šumadija, which included the municipalities of Kragujevac, Kraljevo and Jagodina, and in 1933 they are joined by the clubs of the municipalities of Čačak and Užice which were part of the Sarajevo Subassociation until then.

== BLP First Division ==
The first edition was played in 1920 and the first two editions were colloquially known as the Serbian Championship's. Until 1927 the champion gets automatically qualified to the Yugoslav Championship, but since that year, the second placed teams of the leagues of Belgrade and Zagreb also get a chance to play on the national highest level by participating in one elimination round. By the mid 1930s the league system suffered numerous alterations, often on a year-to-year basis, however since then the subassociation leagues became a way for clubs to qualify to a group phase which was the intermediate level to reach the national top level, although the BLP and Zagreb champions still qualified directly. By the late 1930s the clubs playing in the Yugoslav Championship did not play any more in the Subassociation leagues. In 1939 the league system is modified in a way that it is introduced the Serbian League, an intermediate level between the BLP and the Yugoslav Championship. After the Axis invasion of Yugoslavia in 1941 and the creation by the occupying German authorities of the puppet Serbian state the Serbian League will become the top-level league during the Second World War in Serbia, having its last edition in 1944. The Serbian League was organised by the Belgrade Football Subassociation.

=== Seasons and champions ===
- 1920: 1st - BSK
- 1921: 1st - BSK
- 1923: 1st - SK Jugoslavija
- 1924: 1st - SK Jugoslavija
- 1925: 1st - SK Jugoslavija
- 1926: 1st - SK Jugoslavija
- 1927: 1st - BSK; 2nd - SK Jugoslavija
- 1928: 1st - SK Jugoslavija; 2nd - BSK
- 1929: 1st - BSK; 2nd - SK Jugoslavija
- 1930: 1st - BSK; 2nd - SK Jugoslavija
- 1931: The season was not finished as the entire league system modified.
- 1932: 1st - SK Jugoslavija; 2nd - BSK; 3rd - BASK; Provincial champion: Sparta Zemun. Note: The clubs were separated in two leagues, the metropolitan, and the provincial.
- 1933: 1st - Sparta Zemun. Note: The clubs that played in the 1932–33 Yugoslav Football Championship did not participated, as the two leagues were played simultaneously and the BLP had a qualifying character for the next season.
- 1934: 1st - BSK; 2nd - SK Jugoslavija; 3rd - BASK; 4th - Sparta Zemun
- 1935:
- 1936: 1st - BSK
- 1937: Note: It was adopted a system where the clubs competing in the national championship do not compete at subassociation level as well.
- 1938: 1st - Jedinstvo Belgrade
- 1939: 1st - Sparta Zemun
- 1940: 1st - Čukarički SK
- 1941: 1st - VSK Valjevo

== BSK vs Jugoslavija rivalry ==
This period was marked by the fierce rivalry between the two most ambitious clubs, BSK and Jugoslavija, respectively named the Blues and the Reds. At the time the press referred to their matches as the Eternal derby. During most of the period when the football season was divided into two halves, the first one being played on subassociation level and the second half at the national one, the BLP League usually served for BSK and Jugoslavija to measure strength between them, although the derby matches would repeat themselves as both usually took place at the national level. There they would face another aspect of Yugoslav football of the era, the equally fierce rivalry between the Belgrade teams and those from Zagreb. Those were usually the championship deciding matches.

== Legacy and aftermath ==
At the end of the Second World War the monarchy was abolished and the country became a federal people's republic, FPRY. The entire football system was restructured. The sub-associations ceased to exist and they gave place to the republics, one of six federal units, associations, although same as before, all of them were under the national Yugoslav Football Association (FSJ). Numerous clubs were disbanded, mostly the ones which had a monarchic or bourgeois connotations, among them Jugoslavija and BSK.

SK Jugoslavija was completely disbanded with most of its property and players, including the field, handed over to the newly formed Red Star Belgrade, while BSK, although initially also disbanded, it ended being restored as OFK Beograd, a medium-small size club with obviously lower ambitions than BSK, and even so their right to assume and claim the continuity was only accepted after the socialist regime ended.

The BSK vs Jugoslavija derby was succeeded by an equally intense Partizan vs Red Star Eternal derby.
