= Serbian Football League (1940–1944) =

Serbian League (Serbian: Српска лига / Srpska liga) was a football league championship played between the late 1930s until 1944 in Yugoslavia. With the creation in April 1941 of the Serbian military administration, which was a quisling civil government set up by German authorities, the league became the highest level domestic football competition within the territory.

It held four editions. The first one was organised by the Belgrade Football Subassociation and was played during the 1940–41 season by the clubs from the Banovina's of Danube, Drina, Morava, Vardar, Vrbas and Zeta. The season ended up interrupted near the end by the April War. In the following season, only the clubs which were part of the Serbian military administration territory continued competing.

The last season, 1943–44, was formed by 10 clubs and was played regularly but was interrupted by the Allied bombing of Belgrade which took place on April 16 and 17, 1944. The last round, the eighth, had been played on March 26 and 27, 1944. Owing to the war, the championship was finished.

== Seasons ==
Qualification for the Yugoslav Championship:

- 1939–40 – winner: BSK
- 1940–41 – winner: BSK

National Championship of the Serbia (Territory of the German Military Commander):

- 1941–42 – winner: SK Jugoslavija
- 1942–43 – winner: BSK
- 1943–44 – winner: BSK (not finished)
