= Croatia national football team results (1940–1991) =

This is a list of the Croatia national football team results from 1940 in Yugoslavia up to the country's independence in 1991.

The 1940s matches include four played by the Banovina of Croatia and another fifteen by the Independent State of Croatia. Then, the Socialist Republic of Croatia played a 1956 match against Indonesia.

In the modern era, the nation played three friendly matches under its new name, the Republic of Croatia, shortly before its independence from Yugoslavia, the first being against the United States in 1990.

== Key ==
All matches listed are friendlies. Numbered matches are recognised by FIFA, while non-numbered matches are recognised by the Croatian Football Federation and/or the other team's governing body but not by FIFA.

Match outcomes

Win
Draw
Loss

== 1940s–1950s ==
=== 1940: Banovina of Croatia ===
2 April 1940 Friendly	Croatia	4–0	Switzerland	Zagreb, Croatia, Yugoslavia
	Matekalo 46'; Cimermančić 70', 82'; Lešnik 84'	Report		Stadium: Igralište Građanskog; Attendance: 10,000; Referee: Giuseppe Scarpi (Italy); Assistant referees: Antun Mlinarić (Croatia); Branko Višnjić (Croatia)

21 April 1940 Friendly	Switzerland	0–1	Croatia	Bern, Switzerland
		Report	Jazbec 21'	Stadium: Wankdorf Stadium; Attendance: 15,000; Referee: Raffaelle Scorzzoni (Italy)

2 May 1940 Friendly	Hungary	1–0	Croatia	Budapest, Hungary
	Dudás 86'	Report		Stadium: Üllői út Attendance: 18,000; Referee: Constantin Rădulescu (Romania)

8 December 1940 Friendly	Croatia	1–1	Hungary	Zagreb, Croatia, Yugoslavia
	Wölfl 10'	Report	Spielmann 26'	Stadium: Igralište Građanskog; Attendance: 8,000; Referee: Giuseppe Scarpi (Italy); Assistant referees: Antun Mlinarić (Croatia); Branko Višnjić (Croatia)

=== 1941: Independent State of Croatia ===
15 June 1941 Friendly	Germany	5–1	Croatia	Vienna, Germany
	Lehner 31', 50' (pen.); Walter 65', 80'; Wilimowski 70'	Report	Wölfl 16'	Stadium: Praterstadion; Attendance: 25,000; Referee: Adolf Miesz (Germany)

8 September 1941 Friendly	Slovakia	1–1	Croatia	Bratislava, Slovakia
	Vysocký 89'	Report	Beda 82'	Stadium: Štadión Pasienky; Attendance: 15,000; Referee: Alois Beranek (Germany)

28 September 1941 Friendly	Croatia	5–2	Slovakia	Zagreb, Croatia
	Pavletić 5', 34'; Wölfl 28', 55'; Pleše 46'	Report	Bešina 75'; Bolček 88'	Stadium: Igralište Concordije; Attendance: 12,000; Referee: Alois Beranek (Germany)

=== 1942: Independent State of Croatia ===
17 January 1942 Friendly	Croatia	0–2	Germany	Zagreb, Croatia
23:00		Report	Brozović 43' (o.g.); Decker 65'	Stadium: Igralište Concordije; Attendance: 12,000; Referee: Josef Mohler (Slovakia)

5 April 1942 Friendly	Italy	4–0	Croatia	Genoa, Italy
	Gabetto 55'; Ferraris 58'; Biavati 63'; Gretar 70' (pen.)	Report		Stadium: Stadio Luigi Ferraris; Attendance: 25,000; Referee: Helmut Fink (Germany); Assistant referees: Scotto (Italy); Boggetti (Italy)

12 April 1942 Friendly	Croatia	6–0	Bulgaria	Zagreb, Croatia
	Kacian 20'; Wölfl 26', 48'; Cimermančić 38'; Pleše 71'; Antolković 86'	Report		Stadium: Igralište Concordije; Attendance: 15,000; Referee: Josef Mohler (Slovakia)

7 June 1942 Friendly	Slovakia	1–2	Croatia	Bratislava, Slovakia
	Fabián 8'	Report	Cimermančić 7', 30'	Stadium: Štadión Pasienky; Attendance: 15,000; Referee: Karl Weimar (Germany)

14 June 1942 Friendly	Hungary	1–1	Croatia	Budapest, Hungary
	Szusza 60'	Report	Pleše 78'; Kacian (red card) 87'	Stadium: Üllői út Attendance: 35,000; Referee: Friedrich Müller (Germany)

6 September 1942 Friendly	Croatia	6–1	Slovakia	Zagreb, Croatia
	Wölfl 32'; Lešnik 65', 76', 90'; Antolković 83'; Cimermančić 88'	Report	Podhradský 81'; Fabián 8'	Stadium: Igralište Concordije; Attendance: 9,000; Referee: Todor Atanasov (Bulgaria)

11 October 1942 Friendly	Romania	2–2	Croatia	Bucharest, Romania
	Radu 30'; Bogdan 70'	Report	Cimermančić 9'; Wölfl 18'	Stadium: ANEF; Attendance: 30,000; Referee: Todor Atanasov (Bulgaria); Assistant referees: Tică Iliescu (Romania); Mielu Petrescu (Romania)

31 October 1942 Friendly	Germany	5–1	Croatia	Stuttgart, Germany
23:00	Janes 20'; Walter 43'; Wilimowski 57', 69'; Klingler 86'	Report	Wölfl 75'	Stadium: Neckarstadion; Attendance: 50,000; Referee: Ferenc Palásti (Hungary)

=== 1943: Independent State of Croatia ===
4 April 1943 Friendly	Switzerland	1–0	Croatia	Zürich, Switzerland
	Amadò 9'	Report		Stadium: Hardturm; Attendance: 25,000; Referee: Generoso Dattilo (Italy)

10 April 1943 Friendly	Croatia	1–0	Slovakia	Zagreb, Croatia
	Antolković 65'	Report		Stadium: Igralište Concordije; Attendance: 10,000; Referee: Todor Atanasov (Bulgaria)

6 June 1943 Friendly	Slovakia	1–3	Croatia	Bratislava, Slovakia
	Danko 35'	Report	Kokotović 2', 85'; Wölfl 82'	Stadium: Štadión Pasienky; Attendance: 20,000; Referee: Peter Kroner (Romania)

=== 1944: Independent State of Croatia ===
9 April 1944 Friendly	Croatia	7–3	Slovakia	Zagreb, Croatia
	Wölfl 8', 19', 76'; Lokošek 27'; Cimermančić 31'; Lešnik 37', 70'	Report	Arpáš 25', 47' (pen.), 88'	Stadium: Igralište Concordije; Attendance: 8,000; Referee: Johann Brandweiner (Germany)

=== 1945: Federal State of Croatia ===
3 September 1945 1945 Yugoslav Football Tournament	Croatia	6–1	Bosnia and Herzegovina	Belgrade, Serbia, Yugoslavia
16:00	Cimermančić (?), 24'; Golub (?); Reberski (?); Reiss (?)	Report	Matijašević (?)	Stadium: 20 Oktobar Stadium; Attendance: 5,000; Referee: Moni Kario (Yugoslavia)

8 September 1945 1945 Yugoslav Football Tournament	Serbia	3–1	Croatia	Belgrade, Serbia, Yugoslavia
16:00	Mitić (?), 90'; Jezerkić 71'	Report	Reiss (?)	Stadium: 20 Oktobar Stadium; Attendance: 12,000

9 September 1945 1945 Yugoslav Football Tournament	Croatia	3–0	(Socialist Republic of Serbia) Vojvodina	Belgrade, Serbia, Yugoslavia
14:00	Reiss (?); Kacian (?); Čajkovski (?)	Report		Stadium: 20 Oktobar Stadium; Attendance: 15,000

=== 1956: Socialist Republic of Croatia ===
12 September 1956 Friendly	Croatia	5–2	Indonesia	Zagreb, Croatia, Yugoslavia
	Matuš 9'; Krstulović 13'; Rebac 17', 54'; Benko 43'	Report	Tan Liong Houw 24'; Aang Witarsa 70'	Stadium: Stadion Maksimir; Attendance: 12,000; Referee: Ezio Damiani (Croatia); Assistant referees: Antun Marek (Croatia); Hermenegildo Kranjc (Croatia)

== 1990s ==
=== 1990: Republic of Croatia ===
17 October 1990 Friendly	Croatia	2–1	United States	Zagreb, Croatia, Yugoslavia
	Asanović 29'; Cvjetković 33'	Report	Murray (yellow card) 36'; Shala (yellow card) 40'; Balboa (yellow card) 61'; Dayak 80'	Stadium: Stadion Maksimir; Attendance: 30,000; Referee: Sergio Coppetelli (Italy); Assistant referees: Dario Boemo (Italy); Giancarlo Dal Forno (Italy)

22 December 1990 Friendly	Croatia	2–0	Romania	Rijeka, Croatia, Yugoslavia
	Peršon (yellow card) 19'; Z. Kranjčar 24'; Bogdan 49'	Report	Petrescu (yellow card) 52'	Stadium: Stadion Kantrida; Attendance: 5,000; Referee: Gerhard Köpel (Austria); Assistant referees: Werner Windismann (Austria); Karl Hitzenhauer (Austria)

=== 1991: Republic of Croatia ===
19 June 1991 Friendly	Slovenia	0–1	Croatia	Murska Sobota, Slovenia, Yugoslavia
	Englaro (yellow card) 19'	Report	Vuković (yellow card) 52'; Komljenović 65'	Stadium: Fazanerija City Stadium; Attendance: 5,000; Referee: Igor Bučar (Slovenia); Assistant referees: Danko Jamšek (Slovenia); Zdravko Martun (Slovenia)

== Record per opponent ==
More wins than losses
As many wins as losses
Fewer wins than losses

Only official matches are displayed.

Opponent	Pld	W	D	L	GF	GA	GD	Win %
Bulgaria	1	1	0	0	6	0	+6	100.00
Germany	3	0	0	3	2	12	−10	0.00
Hungary	3	0	2	1	2	3	−1	0.00
Italy	1	0	0	1	0	4	−4	0.00
Romania	1	0	1	0	2	2	+0	0.00
Slovakia	7	6	1	0	25	9	+16	85.71
Slovenia	1	1	0	0	1	0	+1	100.00
Switzerland	1	0	0	1	0	1	−1	0.00
Total: 8 teams played	17	8	3	6	37	30	+7	47.06
