= Slavin Cindrić =

Croatian footballer

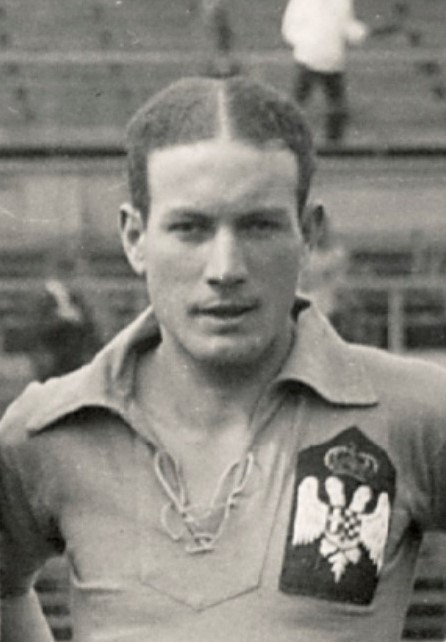
- Slavin Cindrić in 1928

Personal information
- Date of birth: 10 August 1901
- Place of birth: Temesvár, Kingdom of Hungary, Austria-Hungary
- Date of death: 29 April 1942 (aged 40)
- Place of death: Zagreb, Independent State of Croatia
- Position: Forward

Senior career*
Years	Team	Apps	(Gls)
1916–1922	Concordia		
1922–1926	Građanski Zagreb		
1926–1930	HAŠK		

International career
1920–1928	Kingdom of SCS	5	(3)
- * Club domestic league appearances and goals

Slavin Cindrić (10 August 1901 – 29 April 1942) was a Yugoslav footballer. He was born in Timișoara.

== Club career ==
Cindrić was one of the few players who had spells with all three Zagreb-based clubs which were prominent in the interwar period - Concordia, Građanski and HAŠK. With Građanski he won three Yugoslav championships, in 1923, 1926 and 1928, and appeared in the 1928 Mitropa Cup quarter-finals.

== International career ==
He is mainly known for being the first player to score a hat-trick for Yugoslavia in a friendly game against Bulgaria held on 30 May 1926. After being 1–0 down at half-time, Cindrić came on as a substitute for Stevan Luburić and scored three goals in the 75th, 83rd and 87th minute at what is today Stadion Maksimir. This proved to be his only goals in his international career which saw him earn five caps for Yugoslavia, including his debut in Yugoslavia's first ever international game, a 7–0 defeat versus Czechoslovakia on 28 August 1920 (he was one of four Croats who appeared in the game, alongside Dragutin Vrđuka, Rudolf Rupec and Artur Dubravčić).

Cindrić was called up to represent the country for the 1920 (other Croats in the roster were Dragutin Vrđuka, Rudolf Rupec, Artur Dubravčić, Vjekoslav Župančić, Jaroslav Schiffer, Dragutin Vragović, Emil Perška and Josip Šolc), 1924 and 1928 Summer Olympics, and he also played 13 games for Zagreb XI in the period between 1920 and 1928. His last international match was on 29 May 1928 against Portugal at the 1928 Olympic tournament in Amsterdam, and he retired from active football in 1930, at the age of 29.

== Personal life ==
He died of pneumonia in April 1942 in Zagreb.
