= 1936–37 Yugoslav Football Championship =

14th State Championship
- Season: 1936–37
- Dates: 13 September 1936 – 30 May 1937
- Champions: Građanski (4th title)
- Matches: 90
- Goals: 341 (3.79 per match)
- Top goalscorer: Blagoje Marjanović (19)

The 1936–37 Yugoslav Football Championship officially called State Championship (Serbo-Croatian and Slovene: Državno prvenstvo; Serbian Cyrillic: Државно првенство), was the 14th season of the main association football competition in the Kingdom of Yugoslavia.

The defending champions were BSK based in the capital Belgrade, who finished third. The season was won by Croatian club Građanski Zagreb led by Hungarian manager Márton Bukovi, with seven points in front of runners-up Hajduk Split. This was the club's fourth Yugoslav national title, and the first one in nearly a decade, having previously won the 1923, 1926 and 1928 editions.

== Teams ==
Location of teams in the 1938–39 Yugoslav championship

As of May 1937, end of season

Team	City	Managers	Ground
BASK	Belgrade	(Kingdom of Yugoslavia) Milenko Jovanović & (Kingdom of Yugoslavia) Milutin Ivković	
BSK	Belgrade	(Hungary) Sándor Nemes	
Concordia	Zagreb	(Kingdom of Yugoslavia) Božidar Ralić & (Hungary) Béla Virág	
Građanski	Zagreb	(Hungary) Márton Bukovi	Stadion Građanskog
Hajduk	Split	(Kingdom of Yugoslavia) Luka Kaliterna	Stari plac
HAŠK	Zagreb	(Kingdom of Yugoslavia) Rudolf Rupec	Stadion HAŠK
SK Jugoslavija	Belgrade	(Kingdom of Yugoslavia) Franjo Giller & (Kingdom of Yugoslavia) Ivan Kumanudi	Stadion Jugoslavije
SK Ljubljana	Ljubljana	(Hungary) Gábor Obitz	Stadion ob Tyrševi cesti
JŠK Slavija	Osijek	(Hungary) Eden Dombóváry	
Slavija	Sarajevo	(Kingdom of Yugoslavia) Risto Šošić	

Managerial changes during season

- Hajduk Split – Ante Blažević replaced by Luka Kaliterna

== League ==
Pos	Team	Pld	W	D	L	GF	GA	GAv	Pts
1	Građanski	18	12	4	2	50	16	3.125	28
2	Hajduk Split	18	9	3	6	39	19	2.053	21
3	BSK	18	8	5	5	48	24	2.000	21
4	SK Jugoslavija	18	9	3	6	39	28	1.393	21
5	Slavija Sarajevo	18	7	3	8	36	40	0.900	17
6	BASK	18	7	2	9	37	40	0.925	16
7	HAŠK	18	5	6	7	22	39	0.564	16
8	SK Ljubljana	18	6	3	9	21	40	0.525	15
9	HŠK Concordia	18	5	3	10	26	48	0.542	13
10	Slavija Osijek	18	5	2	11	23	47	0.489	12

Source: rsssf.org

== Results ==
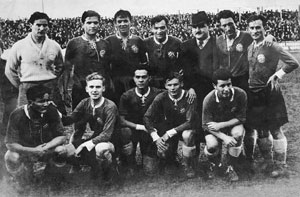
Winning Gradjanski lineup of 1937 Yugoslavia championship

Home \ Away	BAS	BSK	CON	GRA	HAJ	HŠK	JUG	LJU	SLO	SLS
BASK		3–1	3–1	2–4	2–1	2–1	1–2	4–1	3–0	2–2
BSK	4–0		0–0	0–4	1–0	4–0	1–2	8–0	4–0	2–2
Concordia	5–1	0–5		0–5	1–1	2–2	4–2	2–2	3–2	5–1
Građanski Zagreb	3–0	1–1	3–0		1–1	4–0	4–2	0–0	5–1	3–2
Hajduk Split	3–1	4–2	5–0	0–1		7–0	1–2	6–0	4–2	3–1
HAŠK	2–2	2–1	4–2	0–4	0–0		1–1	3–1	2–2	3–1
Jugoslavija	0–5	2–2	7–0	1–1	0–1	2–0		3–0	5–1	1–0
Ljubljana	2–1	0–3	3–0	0–4	0–1	0–0	2–1		2–0	4–1
Slavija Osijek	4–3	1–1	1–0	4–3	2–1	0–1	1–4	0–3		2–1
Slavija Sarajevo	4–2	3–8	1–1	2–0	3–0	4–1	3–2	3–1	2–0	

Source: DataSoccer.it
Legend: Blue = home team win; Yellow = draw; Red = away team win.

== Winning squad ==
Champions: Građanski Zagreb (coach: Marton Bukovi)

- Emil Urch (18)
- Branko Pleše (17/11)
- Mirko Kokotović (17/2)
- Ivan Jazbinšek (17)
- Jozo Kovačević (16)
- August Lešnik (15/16)
- Bernard Hügl (15)
- Ivan Medarić (14/8)
- Svetozar Đanić (13/4)
- Milan Antolković (12/7)
- August Bivec (11)
- Miroslav Brozović (10/2)
- Franjo Cesarec (7)
- Antun Pogačnik (5)
- Marko Rajković (3)
- August Jutt (3)
- Idriz Lađarević (2)
- Boris Župančič (2)
- Dragutin Košutić (1)

== Top scorers ==
Final goalscoring position, number of goals, player/players and club.

- 19 goals – Blagoje Marjanović (BSK)
- 16 goals – August Lešnik (Građanski)
- 12 goals – Frane Matošić (Hajduk Split), Aleksandar Petrović (Jugoslavija), Milan Rajlić (Slavija Sarajevo), Rudolf Chmelicek (Slavija Osijek)
- 11 goals – Branko Pleše (Građanski), Aleksandar Tomašević (BASK)
- 8 goals – Ivan Medarić (Građanski), Leo Lemešić (Hajduk Split), Vojin Božović (BSK), Dobrivoje Zečević (Jugoslavija), Ratomir Čabrić (BASK)

== See also ==
- Yugoslav Cup
- Yugoslav League Championship
- Football Association of Yugoslavia
