= 1939–40 Yugoslav Football Championship =

17th State Championship
- Season: 1939–40
- Champions: Građanski (5th title)
- Matches: 30
- Goals: 111 (3.7 per match)
- Top goalscorer: Svetislav Glišović (10)

The 1939–40 Yugoslav Football Championship (Serbo-Croato-Slovenian: Državno prvenstvo 1939/40 / Државно првенство 1939/40) was the 17th, and last, season of Kingdom of Yugoslavia's premier football competition. The season lasted from 2 May to 19 June 1940.

The league played a contracted season. In 1939, as the Second World War began in parts of Europe, Croatian and Slovenian clubs began leaving the Football Association of Yugoslavia and joining the Croatian Football Federation, in protest of the supposed sports' centralization among Serbs in Belgrade.

The league included now two separate leagues which would function as qualifying leagues for the final stage, the Serbian Football League and the Croatian-Slovenian Football League. The top three clubs from each league will qualify for the final stage of the Yugoslav Championship. The Croatian-Slovenian League was formed by the clubs of the newly formed Banovina of Croatia and the Drava Banovina (corresponding to Slovenia and whose only participant was NK Ljubljana), while the Serbian League was formed by the rest of the Banovinas, namely the Danube, Drina, Morava, Vardar, Vrbas and Zeta ones. BSK, Slavija and Jugoslavija qualified through the Serbian one, while Građanski, Hajduk and HAŠK through the Croatian-Slovenian. At the end of the season Građanski won the national title. The Yugoslav First League continued on, soon to be renamed the Serbian First League. The split was eventually rectified with the promise of more representation for Croats and Slovenes, with the national football association being restructured as the Supreme Football Association of Yugoslavia. A short, ten-game season was played.

Having been invaded by the Axis powers on 6 April 1941, the Kingdom of Yugoslavia was dismembered and this would be the last Yugoslav Championship. In 1940 the qualifiers for the Yugoslav Championship were played split in three qualifying leagues, the Serbian League and, instead of the Croato-Slovenian there was now a separate Croatian and Slovenian League. The three leagues were supposed to be the qualifiers for the 1940–41 Yugoslav Championship, however the championship was never played. Instead, the 1940–41 Croatian First League became the national championship of the newly created Nazi puppet state Independent State of Croatia (NDH), which enjoyed peace per se as an Axis member and continued to hold national competitions until 1944, while the Serbian Football League became the national championship of the occupied Serbia.

In 1946, the Yugoslav First League was reestablished.

== Qualifiers for the final stage ==
- 1939–40 Serbian Football League
- 1939–40 Croato-Slovenian Football League

== League table of the final stage ==
Pos	Team	Pld	W	D	L	GF	GA	GR	Pts
1	Građanski Zagreb (C)	10	8	0	2	25	11	2.273	16
2	BSK	10	7	1	2	30	7	4.286	15
3	Slavija Sarajevo	10	7	0	3	14	14	1.000	14
4	SK Jugoslavija	10	3	2	5	16	18	0.889	8
5	Hajduk Split	10	1	3	6	14	29	0.483	5
6	HAŠK	10	1	0	9	12	32	0.375	2

Source: rsssf.org
Rules for classification: 1st points; 2nd goal average.
(C) Champions

== Results ==
Home \ Away	BSK	GRA	HAJ	HŠK	JUG	SLA
BSK		0–1	9–0	4–0	3–1	6–0
Građanski Zagreb	2–3		4–2	2–1	4–0	1–2
Hajduk Split	1–1	0–2		5–1	1–1	2–4
HAŠK	1–3	0–4	4–1		3–5	0–1
SK Jugoslavija	1–0	1–2	1–1	6–2		0–1
Slavija Sarajevo	0–1	2–3	2–1	1–0	1–0	

Source: DataSoccer.it
Legend: Blue = home team win; Yellow = draw; Red = away team win.

== Winning squad ==
Champions: Građanski Zagreb
Player
Emil Urch
Miroslav Brozović
Ivan Jazbinšek
Zvonimir Cimermančić
Svetozar Đanić
Ivan Belošević
August Lešnik
Milan Antolković
Florijan Matekalo
Drago Žalant
Mirko Kokotović
Manager: Marton Bukovi

== Top scorers ==
Final goalscoring position, number of goals, player/players and club.

- 10 goals – Vojin Božović (BSK)
- 9 goals – August Lešnik (Građanski), Svetislav Glišović (BSK)
- 8 goals – Aleksandar Petrović (SK Jugoslavija)
- 5 goals – Zvonimir Cimermančić (Građanski), Franjo Wölfl (Građanski)

== See also ==
- Yugoslav Cup
- Yugoslav League Championship
- Football Association of Yugoslavia
