= Football in Zagreb =

Football is the most popular sport, both in terms of participants and spectators, in Zagreb. Zagreb has several of Croatia's significant football clubs.

== Introduction ==
GNK Dinamo Zagreb is Zagreb's most successful club.

Maksimir Stadium, Dinamo's home ground is located in the city centre. It is also the home venue of the Croatia national football team.

== History ==
Football was popularized in Zagreb by Franjo Bučar in the late 19th century. The earliest clubs were founded before World War I - HAŠK and PNIŠK in 1903, Concordia in 1906 and Građanski in 1911. First league competition in Croatia started in Zagreb in 1912. After World War I Zagreb clubs joined the Yugoslav First League, with Građanski, Concordia and HAŠK becoming yugoslav champions. In 1945 old clubs were dissolved and new, the likes of Dinamo, Zagreb and Lokomotiva, were founded by the socialist regime. Dinamo later became four time champion of Yugoslavia.

== Clubs ==
The table below lists all Zagreb clubs.

- Active

Club	Founded
Dinamo	1945
Dubrava	1945
HAŠK	1990
Hrvatski Dragovoljac	1975
Jarun	1921
Kustošija	1929
Lokomotiva	1914
Lučko	1931
Rudeš	1957
Trešnjevka	1926
Zagreb	1908

- Defunct

Club	Years
Concordia	1906-1945
Croatia Sesvete	1957-2012
Croatia Zagreb	1907-1945
Ferraria	1922-1945
Građanski	1911-1945
HAŠK	1903-1945
Ilirija	1909-1941
PNIŠK	1903-1909
Viktorija	1907-1945
Zagrebački Plavi	1945-1980

== Honours ==
- Croatian Football Champions (22)
  - Dinamo (21)
  - Zagreb (1)
- Yugoslav Football Champions (12)
  - Građanski (5)
  - Dinamo (4)
  - Concordia (2)
  - HAŠK (1)
- Croatian Cup (15)
  - Dinamo (15)
- Yugoslav Cup (8)
  - Dinamo (7)
  - Građanski (1)
- Croatian Super Cup (6)
  - Dinamo (6)

== Zagreb derbies ==
There were major Zagreb derbies before World War II between Građanski, HAŠK and Concordia. In the period from 1945 until 1960 the main city derby was between Dinamo and Lokomotiva.

== Stadia ==
- Stadion Kranjčevićeva
- Stadion Maksimir
- Stadion Lučko
- Stadion NŠC Stjepan Spajić
- Stadion ŠC Rudeš

== See also ==
- Football in Croatia
