= Stadion Koturaška =

Football stadium in Zagreb, Croatia

Koturaška
- Location: Zagreb, Croatia
- Capacity: 10,000
- Surface: Grass
- Field size: 100 x 60 m

Construction
- Built: 1924
- Closed: 1948
- Demolished: 1950s

Tenants
- Građanski Zagreb (1924–1945); Dinamo Zagreb (1945–1948)

Stadion Koturaška, also referred to as Građanski Stadium (Croatian: Igralište Građanskog) was a football stadium in Zagreb, the capital of Croatia. Located at Koturaška Road (Koturaška cesta) in today's Trnje neighbourhood the ground was originally built as a velodrome in 1894, before becoming a football pitch a decade later. It was redeveloped in the 1920s and used by the local club Građanski Zagreb from 1924 to 1945.

After the end of World War II Građanski, along with all other clubs in the city, were dissolved, and the ground was taken over by the newly formed NK Dinamo Zagreb, who used is as their home ground until 1948, when they moved to their present-day home at Stadion Maksimir, which had been used before the war by Građanski's cross-city rivals HAŠK. In the following years the ground at Koturaška was abandoned, and eventually demolished in the early 1950s.

== Timeline ==
- 1894 – A 500-meter velodrome is built at the present-day Koturaška Road, to be used by the First Croatian Cycling Society (Croatian: Prvo hrvatsko biciklističko društvo). According to some sources, the name of the road itself came from the original velodrome built there as koturaši was an archaic Croatian colloquial term used for cyclists in the early 20th century. The name could thus be translated as "Cyclists' Road."
- 1907 – The first football club founded in Zagreb known as PNIŠK (short for Prvi nogometni i športski klub, lit. "First football and sports club") takes over the velodrome, which in the meantime had fallen into disrepair. They turn it into a multi-sports ground, with a football pitch at its center. The cycling track around the pitch is converted into a 500-metre athletics track, the first of its kind in Zagreb.
- 1909 – After using the ground for occasional matches between PNIŠK and HAŠK, the first two football clubs in Zagreb, PNIŠK is dissolved in 1909 and the ground is abandoned.
- 1911 – Građanski Zagreb football club is founded. In the 1910s they use several training grounds in Tuškanac, Martinovka and Kanal neighborhoods.
- 1924 – Građanski's ground located next to PNIŠK's old ground at Koturaška is finished and officially opened by Stjepan Radić, a prominent Croatian politician. The pitch measured 100x60 meters and featured a 400-metre athletics track. A wooden stand was later added, designed by the architect Gjuro Kastl, with a capacity of 1,618. From then onwards, the stadium is commonly referred to as Građanski Stadium (Croatian: Igralište Građanskog).
- 1945 – Građanski is officially disbanded by a decree issued by the communist authorities on 6 June 1945. Stadion Koturaška is taken over by the newly established NK Dinamo Zagreb, who use it for their first match on 23 June 1945, a friendly against the Yugoslav Air Force team. In the following years Dinamo use Koturaška, as well as several other grounds around Zagreb which had been nationalised in 1945, until they permanently move to HAŠK's old ground in Maksimir in 1948. They play their first game at Maksimir on 19 November 1949 against FK Partizan.
- 1954 – The first phase of the new upgraded Stadion Maksimir is completed on the site of HAŠK's former ground, designed by architects Vladimir Turina and Franjo Neidhardt. The venue is expanded further in a series of renovations between 1952 and early 1960s, with the north stand added in 1955 and the east stand constructed in 1961. This brings up the total capacity to around 60,000 by 1961. The football pitch measures 105x70 meters and the stadium features a 400-meter athletics track. Meanwhile, the old stadium at Koturaška is abandoned in the early 1950s and eventually demolished.

== International matches ==
In the 1920s and 1930s the Kingdom of Yugoslavia national team often hosted matches in Zagreb, but the main venues used for these were grounds owned by Concordia and HAŠK football clubs (present-day Stadion Kranjčevićeva and Stadion Maksimir). However, in May 1932 Koturaška hosted a friendly between Kingdom of Yugoslavia and Poland, which attracted a crowd of 6,000 and ended in Poland's 3–0 win.

In 1940 the team of Banovina of Croatia (at the time province of the Kingdom of Yugoslavia) played two unofficial international matches at the stadium, beating Switzerland 4–0 in April (through goals from Florijan Matekalo, August Lešnik and a brace by Zvonko Cimermančić) in front of a crowd of 10,000, and drawing 1–1 against Hungary in December, with Franjo Wölfl scoring the single goal for the home team, in front of 8,000 spectators. All the players who scored for Croatia at Koturaška in 1940 were footballers of Građanski.

Following the 1941 invasion of Yugoslavia, the new Nazi-allied regime formed the Independent State of Croatia (NDH) and organized a national team, which was officially recognized by FIFA. They hosted a number of international friendlies in Zagreb during World War II, all of them with teams of other Axis nations. Although the national football championship was also played intermittently throughout the war, with Građanski hosting matches at Koturaška, the wartime NDH team's primary home stadium was Concordia's ground located on the site of modern-day Stadion Kranjčevićeva.
