= 1912 Croatian First League =

The 1912 Croatian First League season was the first to be organized by the Croatian Football Federation. Despite the championship being abandoned before its completion, HAŠK Zagreb was declared the champion.

== League ==
Pos	Team	Pld	W	D	L	GF	GA	GD	Pts
1	HAŠK Zagreb	7	7	0	0	34	3	+31	14
2	HŠK Concordia Zagreb	6	5	0	1	26	4	+22	10
3	HŠK Građanski Zagreb	7	2	1	4	9	23	−14	5
4	HŠK Croatia Zagreb	6	1	1	4	8	19	−11	3
5	HŠK Ilirija Zagreb	3	1	0	2	5	8	−3	2
6	Tipografski SK Zagreb	7	1	0	6	6	31	−25	2

Source: rsssf.org

== See also ==
- Prva HNL
- Croatian Football Federation
