= 1940–41 Croatian First League =

The Croatian League season of 1940-1941 was the first held in the Banovina of Croatia. Hajduk Split was the league champion. The league was organized by the Croatian Football Federation.

== League ==
Pos	Team	Pld	W	D	L	GF	GA	GD	Pts
1	HŠK Hajduk Split	18	14	3	1	75	17	+58	31
2	1.HŠK Građanski Zagreb	18	11	7	0	75	17	+58	29
3	HŠK Concordia Zagreb	18	13	2	3	62	22	+40	28
4	HAŠK Zagreb	18	7	6	5	42	31	+11	20
5	NK Slavija	18	7	3	8	30	49	−19	17
6	RSD Split	18	6	4	8	21	50	−29	16
7	SAŠK Sarajevo	18	5	3	10	17	44	−27	13
8	HŠK Željezničar Zagreb	18	2	6	10	20	43	−23	10
9	HŠK Slavija Osijek	18	3	3	12	23	53	−30	9
10	HAD Bačka Subotica	18	2	3	13	19	58	−39	7

Source: rsssf.org

== Champions ==
Hajduk Split (Coach: Ljubo Benčić)
Miljenko Krstulović
Ljubomir Kokeza
Jozo Matošić
Gajo Raffanelli
Anđelko Marušić
Branko Bakotić
Ivo Alujević
Ratko Kacijan
Frane Matošić
Jiri Sobotka
Ivo Radovniković
