= 1928 Yugoslav Football Championship =

Yugoslav Championship
- Season: 1928
- Champions: Građanski

The 1928 National Championship (Serbo-Croato-Slovenian: Državno prvenstvo 1928. / Државно првенство 1928.) proclaimed Gradanski Zagreb once again as the reigning champions, with Hajduk and BSK following closely behind.

== Qualifications ==
The champions of the Belgrade, Split and Zagreb subassociations qualified directly to the final phase, while the second place teams of Belgrade and Zagreb, along with the champions of the rest of the subassociations, played a two-legged elimination round.

The representatives were:

- Subassociation of Belgrade: SK Jugoslavija (qualified directly) and BSK Belgrade
- Subassociation of Zagreb: Građanski Zagreb (qualified directly) and HAŠK
- Subassociation of Split: Hajduk Split (qualified directly)
- Subassociation of Ljubljana: Primorje
- Subassociation of Osijek: Građanski Osijek
- Subassociation of Sarajevo: SAŠK
- Subassociation of Subotica: SAND Subotica

Qualifying round:

- BSK – Građanski Osijek 6:1, 6:1
- HAŠK – SAND 6:1, 4:2
- Primorje – SAŠK 4:3, 2:3, extra match: 2:3

The qualifiers were played in both, home and away matches, and were played on June 10 the first leg, and on June 17 the second. Primorje and SAŠK needed an extra match which was played on June 18 in Sarajevo.

== League ==
Pos	Team	Pld	W	D	L	GF	GA	GR	Pts	Qualification
1	Građanski	5	4	1	0	10	5	2.000	9	Qualification for Mitropa Cup
2	Hajduk Split	5	2	2	1	13	7	1.857	6 (Note: It is unclear why Hajduk Split was ranked above BSK Beograd, as the results show that BSK had more wins than Hajduk, although they were still tied. One argument is that the goal differential determined that, however goal difference should only be taken into account if the two teams are equal in wins, draws and losses.)	
3	BSK	5	3	0	2	12	15	0.800	6	Qualification for Mitropa Cup
4	SAŠK	5	2	1	2	13	8	1.625	5 (Note: Politika reported that on the second round, SAŠK was suspended for having abandoned the match in the 8th minute of the second half when playing against BSK. Because of that, they were suspended for 3 months, however they were allowed to play the three matches left because none of them would have influence in the title.)	
5	HAŠK	5	1	0	4	9	13	0.692	2	
6	SK Jugoslavija	5	0	2	3	5	14	0.357	2	

Source: rsssf.org

== Results ==
Home \ Away	BSK	GRA	HAJ	HŠK	JUG	SAŠ
BSK Belgrade		1–2		4–3	4–1	
Građanski Zagreb			2–0	4–3	1–1	
Hajduk Split	7–0			2–1	2–2	2–2
HAŠK						1–3
SK Jugoslavija				0–1		
SAŠK Sarajevo	2–3	0–1			6–1	

Source: DataSoccer.it
Legend: Blue = home team win; Yellow = draw; Red = away team win.

== Winning squad ==
Champions: 1. HŠK GRAĐANSKI (Manager: Josef Brandstetter)

- Maksimilijan Mihelčič
- Zvonimir Gmajnički
- Franz Mantler
- Rudolf Hitrec
- Viktor Mihaljević
- Miho Remec
- Nikola Babić
- Dragutin Babić
- Emil Perška
- Slavin Cindrić
- Franjo Giller

== Top scorers ==
Final goalscoring position, number of goals, player/players and club.

- 1 - 8 goals - Ljubo Benčić (Hajduk Split)
- 2 - 5 goals - Branko Zinaja (HAŠK)
- 3 - 3 goals - Dragutin Babić, Slavin Cindrić (both Građanski Zagreb), Kuzman Sotirović, Milorad Dragičević (both BSK Belgrade)

== See also ==
- Yugoslav Cup
- Yugoslav League Championship
- Football Association of Yugoslavia
