= Emil Perška =

Croatian footballer (1896–1945)

Personal information
- Full name: Emanuel Perška
- Date of birth: 20 June 1896
- Place of birth: Zagreb, Croatia-Slavonia, Austria-Hungary
- Date of death: 8 May 1945 (aged 48)
- Place of death: Zagreb, FS Croatia, DF Yugoslavia
- Position: Forward

Senior career*
Years	Team	Apps	(Gls)
1919–1920	HŠK Građanski		
1920–1923	CA Sports Généraux		
1923–1929	HŠK Građanski		

International career
1920–1927	Kingdom of SCS	14	(2)
- * Club domestic league appearances and goals

Emanuel "Emil" Perška (20 June 1896 – 8 May 1945) was a Croatian footballer. He was born in Zagreb and spent the majority of his career with Građanski Zagreb, with whom he won three Yugoslav championships in the 1920s. He was also a member of the Yugoslav squad at the 1920, 1924 and 1928 Olympic tournaments.

== Club career ==
Born in Zagreb in present-day Croatia, Perška was a member of the Slovak ethnic minority. Following World War I Perška was wanted by the authorities as he was accused of desertion. Perška then escaped to Vienna to avoid arrest and it was there that he signed a professional contract with Građanski in 1919 before returning to the country.

== International career ==
He was called up for Kingdom of Yugoslavia's first international tournament, at the 1920 Olympics in Antwerp, and he appeared in the country's first ever international match on 28 August 1920, a 7–0 defeat to Czechoslovakia. After the tournament Perška had signed for Parisian side CA Sports Généraux and had a brief spell with them before returning to Građanski in the early 1920s.

During the 1920s Perška helped Građanski win three Yugoslav championship titles (1923, 1926 and 1928) and was called up to the national squad for the 1924 and 1928 Olympics, although he was unused at the 1928 tournament. He was capped 14 times and scored 2 international goals before retiring in 1929. His final international was a July 1927 friendly against Czechoslovakia.

After retirement Perška worked as a journalist and sports historian. He was allegedly a fervent supporter of the Ustaše movement during World War II, and was shot by the Yugoslav Partisans in May 1945 in Zagreb (like several other notable footballers such as Građanski's Dragutin Babić and Concordia's Slavko Pavletić).

== Honours ==
- Kingdom of Yugoslavia Championship (3): 1923, 1926, 1928
