= HŠK Zemun =

- Full name: Hrvatski športski klub Zemun
- Founded: before 1939
- Dissolved: after 1945

Hrvatski športski klub Zemun was a football club from Zemun (nowadays Serbia). Local Croats from Zemun and other parts of Syrmia gathered around this club.

== History ==
This squad was founded before 1939.

It competed in the football championship of Independent State of Croatia. After the end of Second World War, that circumstance was used to ban the work of this football club and disband it, as it was the case with other clubs that competed in the championship of, fascist, Independent State of Croatia.

In the championship of Croatia in 1943, club was the champion of Zemun. In the second stage, HŠK Zemun played in the group with HŠK Bata Borovo, being first again. In the third stage, they reached the quarterfinals, losing to strong Zagreb squad HAŠK.
