= Danijel Premerl =

Croatian footballer

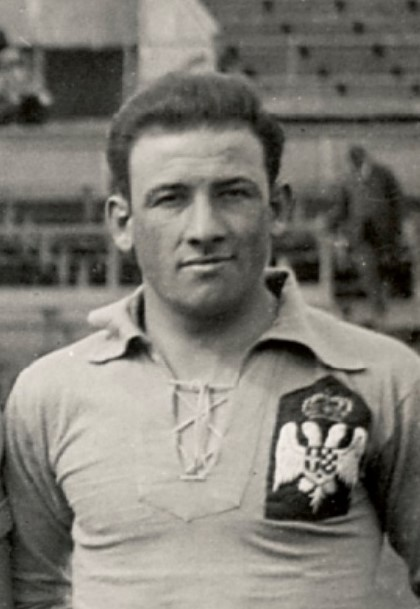
- Danijel Premerl in 1928

Personal information
- Date of birth: 23 January 1904
- Place of birth: Krapina, Austro-Hungary
- Date of death: 1 October 1975 (aged 71)
- Place of death: Zagreb, SFR Yugoslavia
- Position: Defender

Youth career
- 1919–1921: HAŠK

Senior career*
Years	Team	Apps	(Gls)
1921–1927	HAŠK		
1927–1928	Viktorija Zagreb		
1928–1932	Concordia Zagreb		
1932–1934	Viktorija Zagreb		
1934–1936	Građanski Zagreb	39	(0)
1939–1941	Viktorija Zagreb		

International career
1925–1932	Kingdom of Yugoslavia	29	(1)
- * Club domestic league appearances and goals

Danijel Premerl (23 January 1904 – 1 October 1975) was a Croatian football player. He was one of few players to play for all four major Zagreb clubs prior to the Second World War. He was part of Yugoslavia's team at the 1928 Summer Olympics. He is buried in Mirogoj Cemetery.

== International career ==
Premerl made his debut for Kingdom of Yugoslavia in an October 1925 friendly match away against Czechoslovakia and earned a total of 29 caps, scoring 1 goal. His final international was a June 1932 Balkan Cup match against Bulgaria.
