= 1941 Croatian First League =

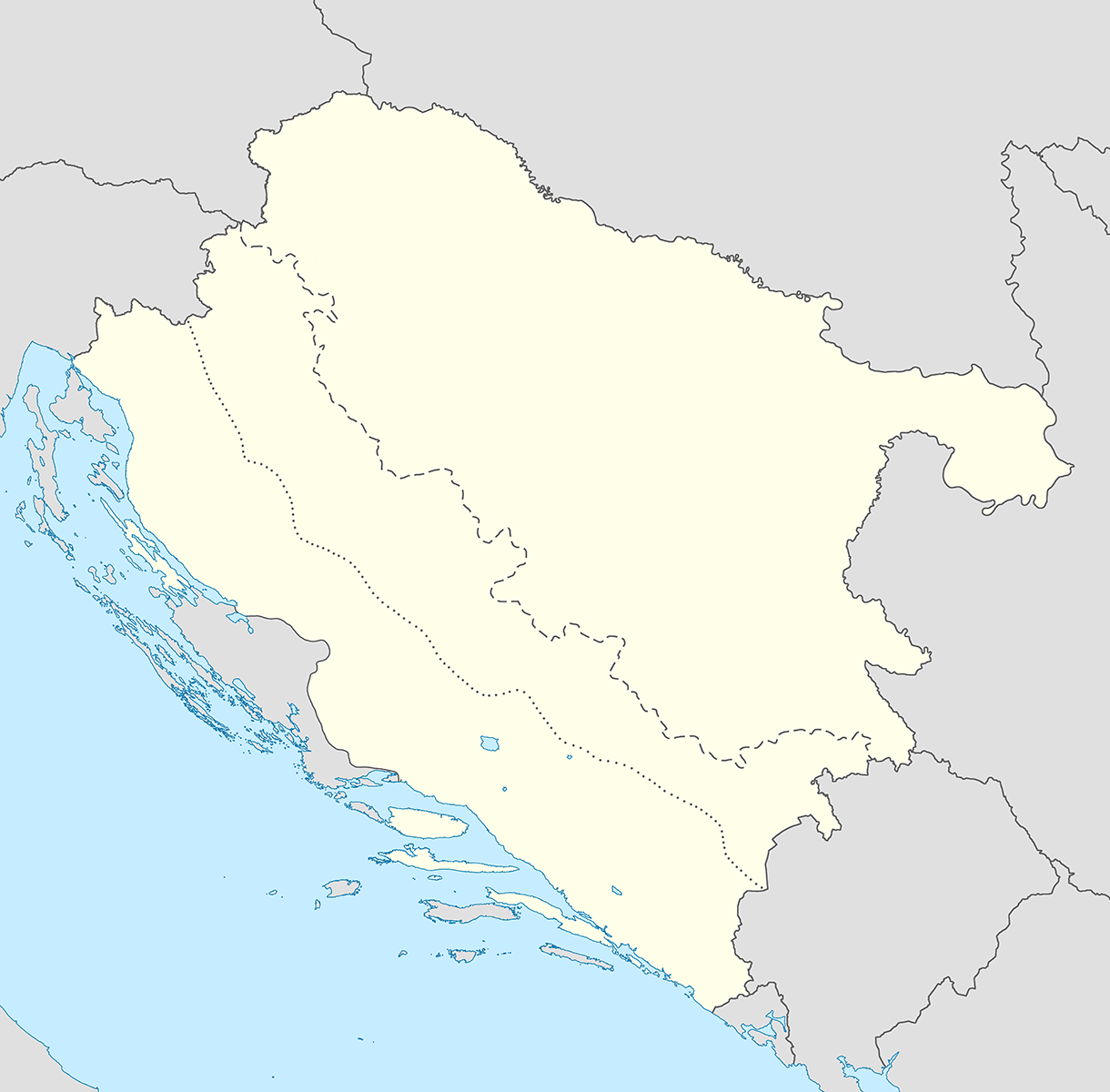
Locations of teams in 1941 Croatian First League

The Croatian First League season of 1941 was the first held in the Independent State of Croatia. Exactly half the season was completed before the league finished play early. Građanski Zagreb was declared champion at this point.

== League ==
Pos	Team	Pld	W	D	L	GF	GA	GD	Pts
1	HŠK Građanski Zagreb	8	7	0	1	41	10	+31	14
2	HŠK Concordia Zagreb	8	6	1	1	33	9	+24	13
3	HŠK Željezničar Zagreb	8	5	2	1	16	12	+4	12
4	HŠK Zrinjski Mostar	8	4	1	3	16	19	−3	9
5	HAŠK Zagreb	8	3	1	4	25	14	+11	7
6	HRSK Zagorac Varaždin	8	2	2	4	13	14	−1	6
7	HŠK Hajduk Osijek	8	3	0	5	12	27	−15	6
8	DSV Victoria Zemun	8	2	1	5	12	33	−21	5
9	SAŠK Sarajevo	8	0	0	8	0	30	−30	0
