= Márton Bukovi =

Hungarian footballer and manager

- Bukovi wearing a Građanski jersey

Personal information
- Date of birth: 10 December 1903
- Place of birth: Budapest, Austria-Hungary
- Date of death: 2 February 1985 (aged 81)
- Place of death: Sète, France
- Position: Defender

Senior career*
Years	Team	Apps	(Gls)
1920–1925	Ékszerészek		
1925–1926	Alba-Audace	16	(23)
1926–1933	Ferencvárosi TC		
1933–1935	FC Sète		

International career
1926–1930	Hungary	11	(0)

Managerial career
- 1935–1945: Građanski Zagreb
- 1945: Croatia
- 1945–1947: Dinamo Zagreb
- 1947–1954: MTK Hungária
- 1955–1956: Újpest
- 1956–1957: Hungary
- 1957–1959: MTK Hungária
- 1960–1961: Dinamo Zagreb
- 1962–1964: Diósgyőri VTK
- 1965–1967: Olympiacos
- * Club domestic league appearances and goals

Márton Bukovi (10 December 1903 – 2 February 1985) was a Hungarian association football player and manager. After playing for Ferencvárosi TC, FC Sète and Hungary, he became a coach, most notably with Građanski Zagreb, MTK Hungária and the Hungary national team. Together with Béla Guttmann and Gusztáv Sebes, he formed a trio of innovative Hungarian coaches who pioneered the 4–2–4 formation.

== Career ==
Bukovi began his coaching career with Građanski Zagreb in 1935, and subsequently guided the club to two Yugoslav and two Croatian league titles. After the Second World War, Građanski was banned and replaced with Dinamo Zagreb and Bukovi remained on as manager of the new club. In 1947 Bukovi was appointed manager of MTK Hungária FC. In 1949 when Hungary became a communist state, MTK were taken over by the secret police, the ÁVH, and subsequently the club became known as Textiles SE. They then became Bástya SE, then Vörös Lobogó SE and then finally back to MTK. Despite this turmoil, the 1950s proved a successful era for the club and with a team that included Péter Palotás, Nándor Hidegkuti, Mihály Lantos and József Zakariás, Bukovi guided them to three Hungarian League titles and a Hungarian Cup.

In Olympiacos Bukovi became a legend for the fans, and wrote history in Greek football by gaining 12 consecutive victories. He transformed Olympiacos and produced many young Greek players. Eventually he was forced to leave the club after a string of poor results in the 1967–68 season but mainly because of the military regime, labeled as a communist. He was forced to resign on 12 December 1967 and left Greece along with his assistant coach Mihály Lantos on 21 December 1967.

Bukovi also played a major role in the success of the legendary Hungary team known as the Mighty Magyars. It was Bukovi, working at MTK with Péter Palotás and Nándor Hidegkuti, who developed the vital 4-2-4 formation, later adopted by national coach Gusztáv Sebes and exported to Brazil by Béla Guttmann. This formation involved the use of either Palotás or Hidegkuti as a deep lying centre-forward. In 1953 Hidegkuti would exploit this position to great effect as he scored a hat-trick for Hungary when they beat England 6-3 at Wembley Stadium. During the Mighty Magyar era, Bukovi also worked as an assistant to Sebes and in March 1956, when the latter was sacked as national coach, he succeeded him. On 23 September 1956 he coached a Hungary team that included Gyula Grosics, József Bozsik, Sándor Kocsis, Nándor Hidegkuti, Ferenc Puskás and Zoltán Czibor to a 1–0 victory over the USSR at the Lenin Stadium. This was the first time the USSR had lost at home.

== Honours ==
=== Player ===
FC Sète 34

- Ligue 1: 1
  - 1933–34
- French Cup: 1
  - 1934

Ferencvárosi TC

- Hungarian League: 4
  - 1925–26, 1926–27, 1927–28, 1931–32
- Hungarian Cup: 3
  - 1926–27, 1927–28, 1932–33
- Mitropa Cup: 1
  - 1928

=== Manager ===
Građanski Zagreb

- Yugoslav First League: 2
  - 1936–37, 1939–40
- Croatian First League: 1
  - 1943

MTK/Textiles/Bástya/Vörös Lobogó

- Hungarian League: 3
  - 1951, 1953, 1957–58
- Hungarian Cup: 1
  - 1951–52

Olympiacos F.C.

- Greek National League: 2
  - 1965–66, 1966–67

== Sources ==
- Behind The Curtain - Travels in Eastern European Football: Jonathan Wilson (2006) Behind the Curtain: Travels in Football in Eastern Europe
