= Premrl =

Premrl is a surname. Notable people with the surname include:

- Janko Premrl (1920–1943), Slovene partisan
- Stanko Premrl (1880–1965), Slovene Roman Catholic priest

== See also ==
- Premerl
