= Maksimilijan Mihelčič =

Slovenian footballer

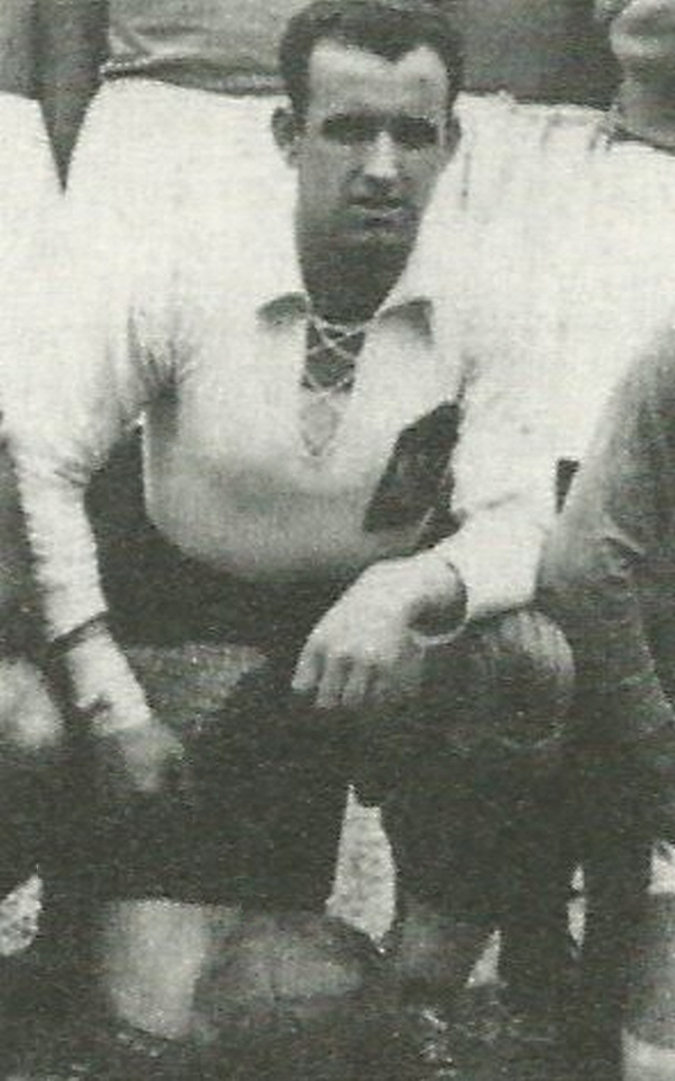

Personal information
- Full name: Maksimilijan Mihelčič
- Date of birth: 29 July 1905
- Place of birth: Laibach, Austria-Hungary
- Date of death: 25 March 1958 (aged 52)
- Place of death: Zagreb, Yugoslavia
- Position: Goalkeeper

Senior career*
Years	Team	Apps	(Gls)
1922–1924	ŽŠK Hermes		
1924–1934	HŠK Građanski Zagreb	119	(0)
1934–1938	HŠK Šparta		

International career
1925–1931	Yugoslavia	18	(0)

Managerial career
- 1945–1947: Dinamo Zagreb (youth)
- * Club domestic league appearances and goals

Maksimilijan "Maks" Mihelčič (Serbian spelling - Максимилијан Михелчић; 29 July 1905 – 25 March 1958) was a Slovenian football goalkeeper who represented the Kingdom of Yugoslavia national team at the 1928 Summer Olympics.

== Club career ==
He began to play in the Ljubljana ŽŠK Hermes, and is celebrated on the goal HŠK Građanski Zagreb in whose jersey has won state championships 1926 and 1928. As keeper of the Civil, succeeded in the club and the team celebrated Dragutin "Karlek" Friedrich, and with Vrđuka, was the third major Yugoslavia national team goalkeeper to 1930. That year he skipped the first World Cup in Uruguay due to political issues. When in 1934 he left Građanski, defended the goal Spartak club in Zagreb appointees Power Station.

== International career ==
Like other Slovenian footballer after Stanko Tavčar, he was in the Yugoslavia national team, and was part of Yugoslavia's team at the 1928 Summer Olympics, but he did not play in any matches. He played 18 games for the Yugoslavia national team: the first one on 28 October 1925 against Czechoslovakia and the last one on 4 October 1931 against Bulgaria at the Balkan Cup.

Mihelčič was a driver by profession, and after World War II was as a youth coach for Dinamo Zagreb.
