= Andrija Mutafelija =

Croatian footballer

Personal information
- Full name: Andrija Mutafelija
- Date of birth: 1883
- Place of birth: Slavonski Brod, Croatia
- Date of death: 1970 (aged 86–87)
- Place of death: Zagreb, Croatia

Senior career*
Years	Team	Apps	(Gls)
1903–1906	PNIŠK		
- * Club domestic league appearances and goals

Andrija Mutafelija (1883–1970) was a Croatian footballer and an important figure in the development of the game.

He was born in Slavonski Brod in 1883. As a member of the early Croatian football club PNIŠK, he was one of the first footballers in Zagreb. He played from 1903 to 1906. He co-founded HŠK Građanski Zagreb in a café on Preradović Square and was its first president from 1911 to 1914. He is credited with making the club competitive in the period directly after the First World War. By trade he was a hat salesman.

He died in Zagreb in 1970.
