= Josip Scholz =

Croatian footballer (1898–1945)

Josip Šolc
Personal information
- Full name: Josip Šolc
- Date of birth: 30 January 1898
- Place of birth: Zagreb, Kingdom of Croatia-Slavonia, Austria-Hungary
- Date of death: 24 September 1945 (aged 47)
- Place of death: Belgrade, FS Serbia, DF Yugoslavia
- Position: Midfielder

Senior career*
Years	Team	Apps	(Gls)
1917–1928	Concordia Zagreb		

International career
1920–1923	Kingdom of SCS	2	(0)
- * Club domestic league appearances and goals

Josip Šolc (30 January 1898 – 24 September 1945) was a Croatian soldier and footballer. He competed for the Kingdom of Serbs, Croats and Slovenes at the 1920 Summer Olympics. He was sometimes referred to as Josip Scholz which is the Germanized spelling.

== Football career ==
Born in Zagreb, he played football as midfielder with HŠK Concordia and was known for his good technical skills.

He made his debut for Yugoslavia in a September 1920 friendly match against Egypt and earned a total of 2 caps, scoring no goals. His second and final international was an October 1923 friendly against Czechoslovakia. Besides football he also practiced fencing and was part of the Little Entente team at Bucharest in 1938.

== Military career ==
He finished the Military Academy and was official in the Yugoslav Royal Army between 1919 and 1940. He was a member of the Nazi-backed Croatian Home Guard. Šolc was commander of the Zagreb Garrison Command. In August 1942 he was awarded the Military Order of the Iron Trefoil 4th Class Cross with Oak Wreath. He was promoted to the rank of infantry general on 22 December 1944.

He was captured by the Yugoslav Partisans in May 1945 and in June was incarcerated in the military prison in Belgrade where he was sentenced to death and executed on 19 September 1945.
