= Franjo Wölfl =

Croatian footballer (1918–1987)

- Wölfl in 1951 holding the Yugoslav Cup trophy.

Personal information
- Date of birth: 18 May 1918
- Place of birth: Zagreb, Kingdom of Croatia-Slavonia, Austria-Hungary
- Date of death: 8 July 1987 (aged 69)
- Place of death: Zagreb, SR Croatia, SFR Yugoslavia
- Position: Forward

Youth career
- HŠK Concordia
- 1935–1937: Viktoria Plzeň

Senior career*
Years	Team	Apps	(Gls)
1937–1938	Viktoria Plzeň		
1938–1945	1. HŠK Građanski	125	(136)
1945–1953	Dinamo Zagreb	100	(80)

International career
1938–1951	Yugoslavia	12	(5)
1938–1952	Zagreb XI	22	
1940	Yugoslavia B	1	(1)
1940	Banovina of Croatia	4	(0)
1941–1944	Independent State of Croatia	14	(12)

Managerial career
- 1954: Yugoslavia (co-manager)
Medal record
Men's Football
Representing Yugoslavia
Olympic Games
Silver medal – second place	1948 London	Team
- * Club domestic league appearances and goals

Franjo "Mara" Wölfl (sometimes spelled Velfl; 18 May 1918 – 8 July 1987) was a Croatian and Yugoslav footballer who played as a forward in the period between the late 1930s and early 1950s. A prolific goalscorer, Wölfl spent most of his career playing for his hometown clubs 1. HŠK Građanski and Dinamo Zagreb.

He was also a Yugoslavia international, both before and after World War II, and was part of the squad which won the silver medal at the 1948 Summer Olympics in London. During the war, he also played in 14 friendlies for the Independent State of Croatia team. After retiring in 1953, he briefly co-managed Yugoslavia during the 1954 FIFA World Cup qualifiers.

== Club career ==
Wölfl spent much of his career with Građanski Zagreb. With Građanski he was the top scorer in the Croatian First League's 1943 season. After World War II, Građanski was disbanded by the communist authorities and Wölfl moved to the regime's newly formed club Dinamo Zagreb. With Dinamo, Wölfl was the Yugoslav First League's top scorer in 1947 and 1948.

== International career ==
Wölfl played international football first with the Kingdom of Yugoslavia national team from 1938 and then the Croatia national team from 1940 to 1944. He played 4 of those for the Jozo Jakopić-led Banovina and the other 14 games under the flag of the Independent State of Croatia, a World War II-era puppet state of Nazi Germany. Finally, Wölfl suited up for communist Yugoslavia's national team from 1945 to 1951.

== Honours ==
=== Club ===
1. HŠK Građanski

- Yugoslav Football Championship: 1939–40
- Croatian Football Championship: 1943

Dinamo Zagreb

- Yugoslav First Federal League: 1947–48
- Marshal Tito Cup: 1951

=== International ===
Yugoslavia

- Balkan Cup runner-up: 1946, 1947
- Olympic tournament silver medalist: 1948 London

=== Individual ===
- Yugoslav championship top scorer: 1946–47, 1947–48
