= Gajo Raffanelli =

Croatian footballer

Personal information
- Full name: Gajetano Raffanelli
- Date of birth: 6 August 1913
- Place of birth: Makarska, Kingdom of Dalmatia, Austria-Hungary
- Date of death: 7 August 1988 (aged 75)
- Place of death: Makarska, SR Croatia, SFR Yugoslavia
- Position: Midfielder

Senior career*
Years	Team	Apps	(Gls)
1928–1938	Zmaj Makarska		
1938–1941	Hajduk Split	68	(0)
1943	HAŠK		
194?–195?	Zmaj Makarska		

International career
1940	Croatia	1	(0)

Managerial career
- 194?–19??: Zmaj Makarska (player-manager)
- * Club domestic league appearances and goals

Gajetano "Gajo" Raffanelli (6 August 1913 – 7 August 1988) was a Croatian footballer who played as a midfielder and made one appearance for the Croatia national team. He later worked as a manager for Zmaj Makarska.

== Career ==
Raffanelli earned his first and only cap for Croatia on 8 December 1940 in a friendly against Hungary. The home match, which was played in Zagreb, finished as a 1–1 draw.

== Personal life ==
Raffanelli died on 7 August 1988 in Makarska at the age of 75.

== Career statistics ==
=== International ===
Croatia
Year	Apps	Goals
1940	1	0
Total	1	0
