= Dragutin Vragović =

Croatian footballer (1897–1973)

Personal information
- Date of birth: 18 September 1897
- Place of birth: Zagreb, Croatia-Slavonia, Austria-Hungary
- Date of death: 23 January 1973 (aged 75)
- Place of death: Zagreb, SR Croatia, SFR Yugoslavia
- Position: Midfielder

Senior career*
Years	Team	Apps	(Gls)
1918–1927	Građanski Zagreb	83	(36)

International career
1920–1923	Kingdom of SCS	7	(0)
- * Club domestic league appearances and goals

Dragutin Vragović (18 September 1897 – 23 January 1973) was a Croatian footballer who spent the majority of his career with Građanski Zagreb in the 1920s. Vragović won two Yugoslav championships with Građanski (1923 and 1926) and was also member of the Yugoslav squad at the 1920 and 1924 Olympic tournaments.

== Career ==
Vragović was known as a reliable utility player at Građanski and performed well in centre back, midfielder and striker roles, in addition to playing as either left or right winger for the national team. He was also Građanski's captain in both of their successful Yugoslav championship campaigns in 1923 and 1926, and was one of their best players when the club toured abroad and defeated Barcelona and Athletic Bilbao in 1923.

He also had 18 appearances for Zagreb XI (1920–1928) and was capped 7 times for Kingdom of Yugoslavia (1920–1923). He was called up for the team's first international tournament, at the 1920 Olympics in Antwerp, and he appeared in the country's first ever international match on 28 August 1920, a 7–0 defeat to Czechoslovakia. He was also an unused substitute at the 1924 Olympics. His final international was an October 1923 friendly match against Czechoslovakia.

== Honours ==
- Kingdom of Yugoslavia Championship (2): 1923, 1926
