= Zvonko Jazbec =

Croatian footballer

Personal information
- Date of birth: 7 September 1911
- Place of birth: Youngstown, Ohio, United States
- Date of death: 15 March 1970 (aged 58)
- Place of death: Zagreb, SFR Yugoslavia
- Position: Goalkeeper

Senior career*
| Years | Team | Apps | (Gls) |
| 1932–1940 | Concordia Zagreb | | |

International career
| 1934–1938 | Yugoslavia | 10 | (0) |
| 1940 | Croatia | 3 | (1) |

Managerial career
- 1948: Kvarner Rijeka
- Orijent Rijeka
- Varteks
- Tekstilac Zagreb
- * Club domestic league appearances and goals

Zvonko Jazbec (Croatian pronunciation: [zʋǒːŋko jǎzbets]; born 7 September 1911 in Ohio, USA-died 15 March 1970 in Zagreb) was a footballer who played as a goalkeeper. He spent his career at HŠK Concordia Zagreb during the 1930s in the Yugoslav First League. Born in the United States, he represented Croatia internationally.

== Club career ==
At age 4, he and his father moved to Croatia where Zvonko eventually established himself at one of the country's top clubs, HŠK Concordia.

== International career ==
Initially trained as an athletic runner, he began to play football for the Yugoslavia national team, making his debut in a March 1934 friendly match against Bulgaria and earning a total of 10 caps. Upon the foundation of the temporary Croatian team after German invasion of Yugoslavia, Jazbec played for his adopted background heritage in 3 international matches, including the very first match against Switzerland. He coincidentally enough also scored a goal during his tenure.
