= Emil Urch =

Croatian footballer and manager

Personal information
- Full name: Emil Urch
- Date of birth: 18 July 1911
- Place of birth: Pula, Croatia-Slavonia, Austria-Hungary
- Date of death: 24 June 1980 (aged 68)
- Place of death: Zagreb, SR Croatia, SFR Yugoslavia
- Position: Goalkeeper

Senior career*
Years	Team	Apps	(Gls)
1934	ZŠK Viktorija		
1935–1945	Građanski Zagreb	55	(0)
1945–1947	Dinamo Zagreb		
1948–1951	NK Jaska		

International career
1942	Independent State of Croatia	2	(0)

Managerial career
- 1948–1951: NK Jaska (player-manager)
- 1953–1955: NK Jaska
- * Club domestic league appearances and goals

Emil Urch (18 July 1911 – 24 June 1980), nicknamed Urec, was a Croatian footballer who played as a goalkeeper and made two appearances for the Croatia national team. He also occasionally played as a forward for NK Jaska, in addition to his usual role as goalkeeper. He later worked as a manager for lower-division clubs in Zagreb.

== Career ==
Urch made his international debut for the Independent State of Croatia, a World War II-era puppet state of Nazi Germany, on 5 April 1942 in a friendly match against Italy, which finished as a 0–4 loss in Genoa. He earned his second and final cap six days later on 11 April in a friendly match against Bulgaria, which finished as a 0–6 loss in Zagreb.

== Personal life ==
Urch died on 24 June 1980 at the age of 69.

== Career statistics ==
=== International ===
Croatia
Year	Apps	Goals
1942	2	0
Total	2	0
