= 1943 Croatian First League =

Statistics of Croatian First League in the 1943 season.

== First stage ==
=== City of Zagreb championship ===
Pos	Team	Pld	W	D	L	GF	GA	GD	Pts
1	HŠK Građanski Zagreb	14	13	0	1	70	10	+60	26
2	HSK Concordia Zagreb	14	9	2	3	44	12	+32	20
3	HASK Zagreb	14	9	2	3	53	16	+37	20
4	HSK Licanin Zagreb	14	7	1	6	28	45	−17	15
5	HSK Zeljeznicar Zagreb	14	5	3	6	25	25	0	13
6	HSK Ferraria Zagreb	14	5	1	8	25	35	−10	11
7	HSK ZET Zagreb	14	1	2	11	8	65	−57	4
8	HSK Redarstveni Zagreb	14	1	1	12	14	60	−46	3

Source: rsssf.org

=== City of Osijek championship ===
- 1 : HSK Gradjanski Osijek
- 2 : HSK Hajduk Osijek

=== City of Zemun championship ===
- 1 : HSK Zemun

=== City of Banja Luka championship ===
- 1 : HSK Hrvoje Banja Luka
- 2 : HBSK Banja Luka

=== City of Sarajevo championship ===
- 1 : SASK Sarajevo
- 2 : HSK Gjerzelez Sarajevo

=== Provincial Zagreb championship ===
- 1 : HRSK Zagorac Varazdin

=== Provincial Osijek championship ===
- 1 : HSK Bata Borovo

=== Provincial Sarajevo championship ===
- 1 : HSK Tomislav Zenica

== Second stage ==
=== Group A ===
Pos	Team	Pld	W	D	L	GF	GA	GD	Pts
1	HSK Zemun	2	2	0	0	5	3	+2	4
2	HSK Bata Borovo	2	0	0	2	3	5	−2	0

Source: rsssf.org

=== Group B ===
Pos	Team	Pld	W	D	L	GF	GA	GD	Pts
1	HSK Hajduk Osijek	4	3	0	1	15	3	+12	6
2	HSK Hrvoje Banja Luka	4	3	0	1	6	5	+1	6
3	HBSK Banja Luka	4	0	0	4	1	14	−13	0

Source: rsssf.org

=== Group C ===
Pos	Team	Pld	W	D	L	GF	GA	GD	Pts
1	SASK Sarajevo	5	3	1	1	13	3	+10	7
2	HSK Tomislav Zenica	4	1	1	2	5	11	−6	3
3	HSK Gjerzelez Sarajevo	4	1	0	3	4	8	−4	2

Source: rsssf.org

=== Group D ===
Pos	Team	Pld	W	D	L	GF	GA	GD	Pts
1	HSK Licanin Zagreb	2	2	0	0	6	1	+5	4
2	HRSK Zagorac Varazdin	2	0	0	2	1	6	−5	0

Source: rsssf.org

=== Play-offs ===
- HASK Zagreb 4-0; 1-2 HSK Zemun
- HSK Hajduk Osijek 0-4; 1-7 HŠK Građanski Zagreb
- SASK Sarajevo 0-0; 0-3 HSK Concordia Zagreb
- HSK Gradjanski Osijek 1-1; 1-4 HSK Licanin Zagreb

== Final Stage ==
Pos	Team	Pld	W	D	L	GF	GA	GD	Pts
1	HŠK Građanski Zagreb	6	6	0	0	25	4	+21	12
2	HASK Zagreb	6	4	0	2	18	10	+8	8
3	HSK Concordia Zagreb	6	1	1	4	10	19	−9	3
4	HSK Licanin Zagreb	6	0	1	5	5	25	−20	1

Source: rsssf.org
