= Miroslav Brozović =

Yugoslav footballer and manager (1917–2006)

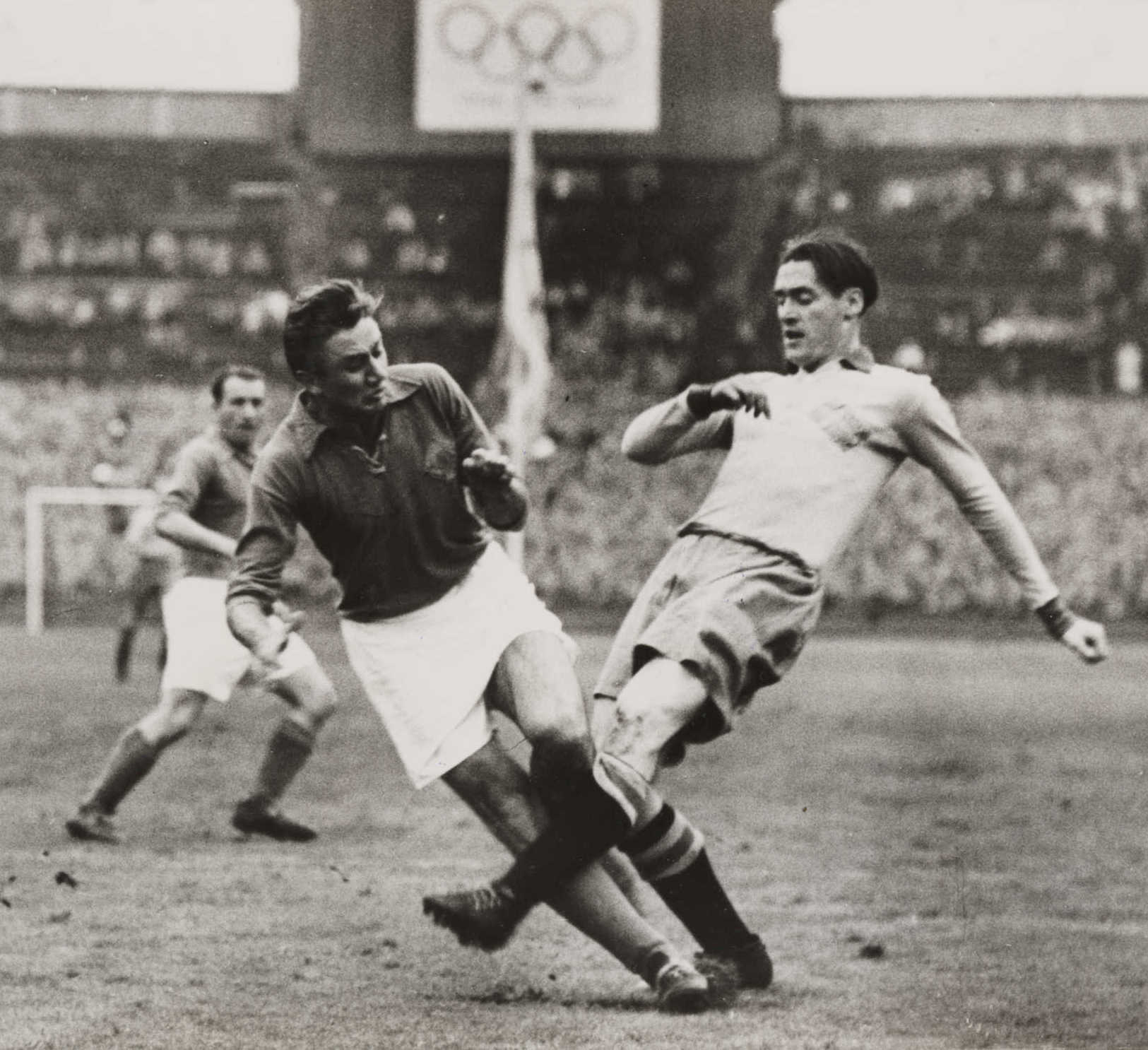
- Brozović (left) at the 1948 Summer Olympics

Personal information
- Full name: Miroslav Brozović
- Date of birth: 26 August 1917
- Place of birth: Mostar, Austria-Hungary
- Date of death: 5 October 2006 (aged 89)
- Place of death: Mostar, Bosnia and Herzegovina
- Position: Defender

Senior career*
Years	Team	Apps	(Gls)
1933–1934	JŠK Mostar		
1934–1935	Zrinjski Mostar		
1935–1945	Građanski Zagreb	131	(17)
1946–1948	Partizan	36	(2)
1948–1953	Sarajevo	55	(2)

International career
1940	Yugoslavia	2	(0)
1941–1944	Independent State of Croatia	15	(0)
1940–1948	Yugoslavia	17	(0)

Managerial career
- 1948–1952: Sarajevo
- 1954–1956: Sarajevo
- 1956–1958: Željezničar
- 1959–1961: Sarajevo
- 1966–1967: Sarajevo
- 1969–1970: Sarajevo
Medal record
Representing Yugoslavia
Olympic Games
Silver medal – second place	1948 London	Team
- * Club domestic league appearances and goals

Miroslav "Meho" Brozović (26 August 1917 – 5 October 2006) was a professional footballer and football manager. Born in Austria-Hungary, he played international football for the Yugoslavia national team as well as the national team fielded by the Independent State of Croatia during World War II. He played as a defender.

== Club career ==
Brozović began his career with local sides JŠK and Zrinjski Mostar before moving to Građanski Zagreb in 1935. With Građanski, he won the Yugoslav First League in seasons 1936–37 and 1939–40 and Yugoslav Cup in 1938 and 1940.

The Communist authorities disbanded Građanski Zagreb, forcing Brozović to move to the newly formed army club Partizan, with whom he won the league title in the 1946–47 season. He also won the Yugoslav Cup in 1947.

From 1948 to 1953, Brozović played for Sarajevo. In the 1948–49 season, he as a player-manager, won the Yugoslav Second League with Sarajevo. He became a club legend at the club. He ended his playing career at Sarajevo in 1953.

== International career ==
Brozović debuted for the Yugoslavia national team in 1940 and played two games before the WWII reached the country. With the creation of the Independent State of Croatia in 1941, the national team was formed for whom he played 15 times during the war. After the war and establishment of SFR Yugoslavia he played for re-established Yugoslavia national football team 17 games.

Brozović won a silver medal for Yugoslavia in football at the 1948 Summer Olympics. He played four matches and scored no goals.

His final international for Yugoslavia was an August 1948 Balkan Cup match against Poland.

== Managerial career ==
Brozović started managing Sarajevo in 1948 as a player-manager. He won the Yugoslav Second League in the 1948–49 season. After ending his playing career in 1953, he became a full-time manager. Brozović left Sarajevo in 1956, and was immediately named manager of Sarajevo's fierce city rival Željezničar. Brozović promoted the club to the Yugoslav First League in 1957. He managed Željezničar until 1958.

In 1959, Brozović once again became the manager of Sarajevo. He stayed at the club until 1961. Five years later, in 1966, for the fourth time in his career, Brozović became the manager of Sarajevo. As manager, he won the club's historic, first ever Yugoslav First League title in the 1966–67 season. After the end of the season, he left Sarajevo in the summer of 1967. He would return to Sarajevo once again and manage the club from 1969 to 1970.

== Death ==
Brozović died in Mostar, Bosnia and Herzegovina in 2006, at the age of 89.

== Honours ==
=== Player ===
Građanski Zagreb

- Yugoslav First League: 1936–37, 1939–40
- Yugoslav Cup: 1937–38, 1940

Partizan

- Yugoslav First League: 1946–47
- Yugoslav Cup: 1947

Sarajevo

- Yugoslav Second League: 1948–49

Yugoslavia

- Summer Olympics Runners-up: 1948

=== Manager ===
Sarajevo

- Yugoslav First League: 1966–67
- Yugoslav Second League: 1948–49

Željezničar

- Yugoslav Second League: 1956–57 (zone II A)
