= Svetozar Đanić =

Serbian footballer (1917–1941)

Personal information
- Full name: Svetozar Đanić
- Date of birth: 1 April 1917
- Place of birth: Manđelos, Kingdom of Croatia-Slavonia, Austria-Hungary
- Date of death: 18 June 1941 (aged 24)
- Place of death: Zagreb, Independent State of Croatia
- Positions: Centre-half; midfielder

Senior career*
| Years | Team | Apps | (Gls) |
| –1934 | Slavija Novi Sad | | |
| 1934–1936 | Vojvodina | | |
| 1936–1937 | Građanski Zagreb | 14 | (4) |
| 1937–1938 | Židenice | | |
| 1938–1939 | Viktoria Plzeň | | |
| 1939–1941 | Građanski Zagreb | 32 | (10) |

International career
| 1940 | Banovina of Croatia | 3 | (1) |
| 1940–1941 | Yugoslavia | 3 | (0) |
| 1941 | Independent State of Croatia | 1 | (0) |
- * Club domestic league appearances and goals

Svetozar Đanić (Serbian Cyrillic: Светозар Ђанић; 1 April 1917 – 18 June 1941) was a Croatian and Yugoslav footballer who played for Yugoslavia and Croatia national teams. He was also known as Milan or Cveta.

== Club career ==
Born during the latter part of World War I in a small Syrmian village, Đanić started playing football with Novi Sad outfit FK Slavija. At the age of 17, he moved to their more established crosstown rivals FK Vojvodina and immediately established himself in the first team.

Two years later, in 1936, together with brother Miran, he moved to Zagreb in pursuit of university studies. Parallel to studies he also played football with HŠK Građanski, spending the 1936–37 season with them.

Đanić's studies then took him to Czechoslovakia for a year where he also played one season for SK Židenice (5 league starts, 3 goals during 1937–38 season) and one season for SK Viktoria Plzeň (1938–39).

== International career ==
Returning to Zagreb, he also continued playing for Građanski, eventually earning a callup to the Yugoslavia national team in 1940. His debut came on 3 November 1940 versus Germany in Zagreb. He would only play in three matches before the Nazi Germany invasion and quick dismemberment of Yugoslavia put an end to Yugoslav football activities. Đanić's last match in Yugoslavia jersey was also Yugoslavia's last outing–a match versus Hungary on 23 March 1941 in Belgrade.

Soon after the Royal Yugoslav Army defeat, and the establishment of Croatian Nazi-puppet state (NDH) under collaborationist Ustasha regime, Đanić played first game for NDH national team in Vienna on 15 June 1941 versus Nazi Germany. Upon returning to Zagreb, he was immediately put on trial by the Ustashas under the accusation that he collaborated with the communists. After a quick show trial, Đanić was executed three days later on 18 June 1941.
