= Jaroslav Šifer =

Yugoslav footballer (1895–1982)

Personal information
- Date of birth: 12 August 1895
- Place of birth: Zagreb, Croatia-Slavonia, Austria-Hungary
- Date of death: 29 November 1982 (aged 87)
- Place of death: Zagreb, SR Croatia, SFR Yugoslavia
- Position: Defender

Senior career*
Years	Team	Apps	(Gls)
1915–1924	Građanski Zagreb	54	(2)

International career
1920–1922	Kingdom of SCS	6	(1)
- * Club domestic league appearances and goals

Jaroslav Šifer (12 August 1895 – 29 November 1982) was a Yugoslav association football defender. He belonged to the first ever Yugoslavia national team and took part at the 1920 Summer Olympics.

He played six games for the national team, including two matches at the 1920 Summer Olympics. At club level he played for Građanski Zagreb.

== Honours ==
Građanski

- Yugoslav First League (1): 1923
- Zagreb Regional Championship (5): 1919, 1920, 1923, 1923–24, 1924–25
