= Branko Pleše =

Croatian footballer

Personal information
- Full name: Branko Pleše
- Date of birth: 12 January 1915
- Place of birth: Delnice, Croatia-Slavonia, Austria-Hungary
- Date of death: 28 March 1980 (aged 65)
- Place of death: Zagreb, SR Croatia, SFR Yugoslavia
- Position: Midfielder

Senior career*
| Years | Team | Apps | (Gls) |
| 1929–1935 | HŠK Concordia | | |
| 1935–1945 | Građanski Zagreb | 116 | (43) |
| 1945–1950 | Dinamo Zagreb | 74 | (6) |

International career
| 1937–1946 | Yugoslavia | 6 | (3) |
| 1941–1944 | Independent State of Croatia | 13 | (3) |

Managerial career
- Sloboda Tuzla
- HNK Dubrovnik
- Trnje
- Dubrava
- 1978: ŽNK Loto Zagreb
- * Club domestic league appearances and goals

Branko Pleše (Croatian pronunciation: [brâːŋko plêʃe]; 12 January 1915 – 28 March 1980), nicknamed Isusek, was a Croatian footballer who played international football for the Croatian and both the royal and communist Yugoslavian national teams.

== Playing career ==
=== Club ===
He began his career with HŠK Concordia before moving to Građanski Zagreb in 1935. Pleše played with Građanski as a striker until its disbanding in 1945. In 1937 and 1940 he was Yugoslavian champion, while in 1941 and 1943 he was champion of Croatia. In 1945 he joined the newly formed Dinamo Zagreb with whom he played until 1950. He was Yugoslavian champion again in 1948.

=== International ===
During his international career with the Kingdom of Yugoslavia he was capped 5 times. During the existence of the Independent State of Croatia, a World War II-era puppet state of Nazi Germany, he was capped for the Croatia national team 13 times, scoring three goals. Finally, he played for Communist Yugoslavia once, in its first game.

== Managerial career ==
He later moved to management, during which time he managed FK Sloboda Tuzla among others.
