= Ivan Belošević =

Croatian footballer

Personal information
- Full name: Ivan Belošević
- Date of birth: 12 September 1909
- Place of birth: Sušak, Rijeka, Croatia-Slavonia, Austria-Hungary
- Date of death: 7 October 1987 (aged 78)
- Place of death: Zagreb, SR Croatia, SFR Yugoslavia
- Position: Left-back

Senior career*
Years	Team	Apps	(Gls)
- HTŠK Grafičar
1931–1937	Concordia		
1937–1941	Građanski Zagreb	47	(0)

International career
1933–1939	Yugoslavia	11	(0)
1940	Croatia	3	(0)
- * Club domestic league appearances and goals

Ivan Belošević (12 September 1909 – 7 October 1987), nicknamed Ivica, was a Croatian footballer. He played international football for both the Kingdom of Yugoslavia national football team and the Independent State of Croatia national football team.

== Club career ==
He was born in Sušak, and started his career with Zagreb's HTŠK Grafičar before moving to HŠK Concordia. With Concordia he won the Royal Championship in 1932. Belošević moved to HŠK Građanski in 1937. He ended his career in 1941, when he became a manager. He died in Zagreb, aged 78.

== International career ==
He made his debut for Yugoslavia in a June 1933 Balkan Cup match against Greece and earned a total of 11 caps scoring no goals. His final international was an October 1939 friendly against Germany. He played three games for the unofficial Croatia national team representing Banovina of Croatia in 1940.
