= Dragutin Babić =

Croatian footballer

Personal information
- Date of birth: 5 November 1897
- Place of birth: Zagreb, Kingdom of Croatia-Slavonia, Austria-Hungary
- Date of death: 17 May 1945 (aged 47)
- Place of death: Zagreb, FS Croatia, DF Yugoslavia
- Position: Defender

Senior career*
| Years | Team | Apps | (Gls) |
| 1919 – 1928 | Građanski Zagreb | 105 | (71) |
| 1929 – 1931 | Concordia Zagreb | | |

International career
| 1921–1931 | Yugoslavia | 11 | (2) |
- * Club domestic league appearances and goals

Dragutin Babić (5 November 1897 – 17 May 1945) was a Croatian footballer who represented the national team of the Kingdom of Serbs, Croats and Slovenes at the 1924 and 1928 Summer Olympics.

== Club career ==
He won three club titles, two with Građanski in 1923 and 1928 and one with Concordia in 1930.

== International career ==
He made his debut for Yugoslavia in October 1921 friendly match against Czechoslovakia, earned a total of 11 caps (scoring 2 goals), and played in all positions, though he was known as a striker. His final international was in March 1931 Balkan Cup match against Greece.
