= Slavko Pavletić =

Croatian footballer (1917–1945)

Personal information
- Date of birth: 15 April 1914
- Place of birth: Zagreb, Austria-Hungary
- Date of death: 27 May 1945 (aged 31)
- Place of death: Zagreb, FPR Yugoslavia
- Position: Defender

Senior career*
Years	Team	Apps	(Gls)
1934–1937	Meteor Zagreb		
1937–1945	Concordia Zagreb		

International career
1941–1942	Independent State of Croatia	4	(2)
- * Club domestic league appearances and goals

Slavko Pavletić (Croatian pronunciation: [slǎːʋko pǎʋletitɕ]; 15 April 1914– 27 May 1945) was a Croatian footballer who played as a midfielder for Meteor Zagreb and Concordia Zagreb.

== International career ==
He made his debut for Croatia under the flag of the Independent State of Croatia, a World War II-era puppet state of Nazi Germany, in a September 1941 friendly match against Slovakia and earned a total of 4 caps, scoring 2 goals. His final international was a November 1942 friendly against Nazi Germany.

== Externbal links ==
- Slavko Pavletić at the Croatian Football Federation
