= HŠK Građanski Zagreb =

Građanski
- Full name: Prvi hrvatski građanski športski klub
- Nickname: Purgeri (The Citizens)
- Short name: Građanski
- Founded: 26 April 1911; 114 years ago
- Dissolved: 6 June 1945; 80 years ago
- Ground: Stadion Koturaška (1924–1945)
- League: Yugoslav Championship (1923–1941); Croatian League (1941–1945)
Home colours

HŠK Građanski (alternatively spelled Gradjanski or Gradanski), also known as 1. HŠK Građanski or fully Prvi hrvatski građanski športski klub (lit. 'First Croatian Citizens' Sports Club'), was a Croatian football club established in Zagreb in 1911 and dissolved in 1945. The club had a huge influence on the development of football in Croatia and Kingdom of Yugoslavia and achieved its greatest success in the period between the two World Wars.

== History ==
=== The golden era ===
Građanski Zagreb squad which won the 1939–40 Yugoslav championship; Standing (L to R): Jazbinšek, Cimermančić, Đanić, Belošević, Lešnik, Urch, Brozović; Crouching: Antolković, Matekalo, Žalant, Kokotović, and coach Bukovi.

In 1911, when Croatia was still part of Austria-Hungary, Građanski was founded in Zagreb by Andrija Mutafelija and a few of his friends in response to rumors that a football club that was meant to play in the Hungarian football league (as opposed to the Croatian Sports Union) was about to be established in the city. Građanski was therefore founded as a multi-sports club with a distinctly Croatian identity intended to cater to the public of Zagreb, with sections dedicated to football, handball, and cycling.

At first the club used grounds in Zagreb's neighbourhoods of Tuškanac, Martinovka and Kanal, until they built their permanent ground Stadion Koturaška, which was officially opened in 1924 by Stjepan Radić, a prominent Croatian politician. Although Građanski lost their first ever game to city rivals HAŠK 1–5, the club soon became popular and widely supported by Zagreb's working class, in contrast to HAŠK, which was an academic sports club affiliated with the University of Zagreb and its students who came to the city from all over the country, and which was more supported by middle class fans.

In the following years, a healthy rivalry developed between the two city clubs. After the Yugoslav championship was launched on a national level in 1923, Građanski's greatest rivals outside of Zagreb soon became BSK Belgrade, SK Jugoslavija, and Hajduk Split. During the 1920s and 1930s Građanski became the most popular club in Zagreb and one of the strongest in the nation, having won five Yugoslav championships (1923, 1926, 1928, 1937, 1940).

=== Građanski abroad ===
Internationally, the club went on several successful tours – on one of these, in 1923 in Spain, Građanski beat Barcelona and Athletic Bilbao. The club often toured Austria and Hungary and played friendly matches with top local sides there. In 1936 they went on tour to England and Scotland where they adopted the WM formation which some sources say helped them win the 1936–1937 Yugoslav championship.

Hungarian coach Márton Bukovi, who first started using the formation as Građanski manager in 1936, later introduced it to Hungary in the late 1940s. He then modified it into the now famous WW system which brought the Hungary national football team to the final game of the 1954 World Cup, and which was later exported to Brazil as the 4–2–4 formation.

Građanski also hosted friendlies with international teams touring this part of Europe. In June 1934 Građanski played a match in Zagreb with the Brazil national team which ended in a 0–0 draw, with footballing greats such as Leônidas and Waldemar in their lineup. In May 1936 Liverpool FC suffered their first continental defeat in Zagreb, a 5–1 thrashing in front of an audience of 10,000 with August Lešnik scoring a hat-trick and Berry Nieuwenhuys claiming a consolation goal for the Reds. In November 1936 the club visited Scotland, and drew 4–4 with Heart of Midlothian at Tynecastle Park.

=== European competitions ===
The club competed in the Mitropa Cup, a regional European club competition, on three occasions, in 1928, 1937 and 1940. In 1928 Građanski were knocked out in the quarter-final by Viktoria Žižkov of Czechoslovakia with 4–8 on aggregate. Nine years later, Građanski exited early again after suffering a 1–6 aggregate loss to Genova 1893 FBC.

In 1940 Građanski managed to beat the Hungarian side Újpest FC 5–0 on aggregate in the quarter-final, only to lose to Rapid Bucharest in the semi-final. Both legs ended goalless, so a playoff game on neutral grounds in Subotica was played, which ended in a 1–1 draw. Rapid Bucharest progressed to the final on a coin toss, although the tie, against Ferencváros, was never played because of the outbreak of World War II.

=== World War II ===
After the invasion of Yugoslavia in April 1941, sports competitions in many parts of the country were suspended. An exception to this was the Independent State of Croatia (NDH), a regime installed by the Axis powers which controlled most of modern-day Croatia and Bosnia and Herzegovina and which enjoyed relative peace. NDH continued to hold national competitions featuring prominent Croatian clubs.

Four of these wartime championships were started (1941, 1941–42, 1942–43 and 1943–44) but only the second and third editions were actually finished, with Građanski winning the 1942–43 season.

When the war ended in the spring of 1945, the club was formally disbanded by the new communist government, along with their city rivals HAŠK and Concordia, and a number of smaller lower-tier clubs. The club's last official game was a 2–2 draw against HAŠK on 10 April 1945. In June 1945 the Dinamo Zagreb multi-sports society was founded, meant to become the city's new football powerhouse.

The newly established Dinamo club adopted Građanski's colours and nickname, and inherited its pre-war fan base, and in 1969 even introduced a club badge designed to resemble Građanski's old emblem. Dinamo also used Građanski's Stadion Koturaška and Concordia's old ground at present-day Stadion Kranjčevićeva in the 1940s before moving to the upgraded version of HAŠK's former ground Stadion Maksimir in 1948, where it remains to this day.

Many former Građanski players continued their career at Dinamo after the war (including Ivan Jazbinšek, August Lešnik, Zvonimir Cimermančić, Milan Antolković) as well as their coach Márton Bukovi, while some others moved to FK Partizan in Belgrade, which was established after the war as the official Yugoslav Army club (these included Florijan Matekalo and Stjepan Bobek).

== Notable players ==
Since Zagreb was home to the Croatian-named Nogometni Savez Jugoslavije ("Football Association of Yugoslavia"; NSJ) since its establishment in 1919, and both Građanski as a club, and Zagreb as a city, were regarded as important footballing centers of Yugoslavia (e.g. three of the city's clubs won Yugoslav championship titles in the 1920s and 1930s: Građanski, Concordia and HAŠK). Because of this, Građanski players were often called up for the Kingdom of Yugoslavia national team, which played competitive matches at Olympic tournaments, the regional Balkan Cup, and World Cup qualifiers.

In the 1920s twelve Građanski players were called up for Yugoslavia's Olympics teams formed for the 1920, 1924 and 1928 Games. Two of them—Slavin Cindrić and Emil Perška—were at all three Olympic tournaments.

In 1929 the association in Zagreb was dissolved after disagreements between the Zagreb and Belgrade regional branches. In May 1930 the association was moved to Belgrade, where it adopted the Serbian name Fudbalski Savez Jugoslavije (FSJ). In protest, Croatian players boycotted the national team which was scheduled to compete at the 1930 World Cup in Uruguay in July. Yugoslavia sent a squad consisting entirely of Serbian players called up from Belgrade clubs, mostly from BSK Beograd, BASK and SK Jugoslavija.

The team managed to beat Brazil 2–1 and Bolivia 4–0 but were then crushed by Uruguay 1–6 in the semi-final. Since Yugoslavia failed to qualify for the next two World Cups in 1934 and 1938, this meant that no Croatian players appeared at World Cup tournaments until Yugoslavia's next appearance after World War II at the 1950 World Cup in Brazil. By that time Građanski had ceased to exist, although Stjepan Bobek, who had initially played for Građanski in 1943–1945 before joining the newly formed Partizan after the war, was a key player for Yugoslavia at both 1950 and 1954 World Cups and at the 1948 and 1952 Olympic tournaments.

The following is a list of Građanski players who earned at least one cap for Kingdom of Yugoslavia national team while playing at the club in the period from 1920 to 1941. Appearances and goals are taken from Football Association of Serbia database, and represent players' career totals. During WW2 the fascist Independent State of Croatia (NDH) fielded its own FIFA-registered national team which played 15 friendlies with other Axis powers teams between 1941 and 1944.

The team was largely composed of Građanski players, and initially managed by Jozo Jakopić, director of Građanski. Players who appeared for NDH in that period are marked with †. After the war and dissolution of Građanski some of its players were called up to play for the newly established communist SFR Yugoslavia team. Only four players appeared for all three national teams during this turbulent period – Miroslav Brozović, Zvonimir Cimermančić, Branko Pleše and Franjo Wölfl.

Like Bobek, Brozović moved to Belgrade and continued to play for Partizan after the war, while the other three joined the newly formed Dinamo Zagreb. In addition, all except Pleše were part of the Yugoslavia squad at the 1948 Olympics in London which won silver medal.

Player	Position	Yugoslavia career	Apps^{a}	Goals^{a}	Olympic squads^{b}
Milan Antolković †	Forward	1937–1939	8	1	
Dragutin Babić	Defender	1921–1931	10	2	1924 OT, 1928 OT
Ivan Belošević †	Defender	1933–1939	11	0	
August Bivec	Defender	1933	1	0	
Dragutin Bratulić	Goalkeeper	1934–1935	3	0	
Miroslav Brozović †	Defender	1940–1948^{c}	17	0	1948 OT
Zvonimir Cimermančić †	Defender	1940–1948^{c}	9	3	1948 OT
Slavin Cindrić	Forward	1920–1928	5	3	1920 OT, 1924 OT, 1928 OT
Eugen Dasović	Defender	1923–1927	10	0	1924 OT
Ernest Dubac †	Defender	1938–1941	14	0	
Svetozar Đanić †	Midfielder	1940–1941	3	0	
Fritz Federber	Defender	1922	1	0	
Franjo Giller	Midfielder	1926–1932	13	3	1928 OT
Franjo Glaser †	Goalkeeper	1933–1940	35	0	
Ivan Granec	Midfielder	1920	1	0	1920 OT
Bernard Hügl	Defender	1934–1939	24	0	
Rudolf Hitrec	Midfielder	1926	1	0	
Ivan Jazbinšek †	Defender	1938–1941	7	0	1948 OT
Hugo Kinert	Midfielder	1921–1922	2	0	
Mirko Kokotović †	Midfielder	1931–1939	23	4	
Gustav Lechner †	Midfielder	1931–1940	44	0	
August Lešnik †	Forward	1937–1940	10	4	
Florijan Matekalo †	Midfielder	1940	1	0	
Maksimilijan Mihalčić	Goalkeeper	1925–1931	18	0	1928 OT
Emil Perška	Forward	1920–1927	14	2	1920 OT, 1924 OT, 1928 OT
Branko Pleše †	Midfielder	1937–1946^{c}	6	3	
Antun Pogačnik †	Defender	1937	2	0	
Danijel Premerl	Defender	1925–1932	29	1	1928 OT
Marko Rajković	Defender	1931–1933	2	0	
Rudolf Rupec	Defender	1920–1924	9	0	1920 OT, 1924 OT
Jaroslav Šifer	Defender	1920–1922	6	1	1920 OT
Vilmos Sipos	Forward	1934–1939	13	1	
Josip Urbanke	Midfielder	1926	1	0	
Dragutin Vragović	Midfielder	1920–1923	7	0	1920 OT, 1924 OT
Dragutin Vrđuka	Goalkeeper	1920–1924	7	0	1920 OT, 1924 OT
Franjo Wölfl †	Forward	1938–1951^{c}	12	6	1948 OT
Aleksandar Živković	Forward	1931–1935	15	15	

† Player also appeared for Independent State of Croatia team (1941–1944).
a. Career totals earned for Kingdom of Yugoslavia national team (1920–1941)
b. Olympic tournament squad which the player was on (whether or not he actually played)
c. Player also appeared for the communist SFR Yugoslavia national team, established after World War 2

== Managers ==
List of managers:

- 1918–1919: (Kingdom of Yugoslavia) Milan Graf
- 1919–1921: (Austria) Karl Heinlein
- 1921–1924: (England) Arthur Gaskell
- 1924–1925: (Austria) Richard Kohn
- 1925–1926: (Hungary) Imre Pozsonyi
- 1926–1929: (Austria) Josef Brandstätter
- 1930–1931: (Austria) Johann Strnad
- 1931–1932: (Austria) Robert Haftl
- 1932–1933: (Hungary) György Molnár
- 1933–1935: (Irish Free State) James Donnelly
- 1935–1936: (Austria) Hans "Anton" Ringer
- 1936–1945: (Hungary) Márton Bukovi

== Honours ==
=== Domestic competitions ===
Yugoslav football league system

- Yugoslav First League
  - Winners (5): 1923, 1926, 1928, 1936–37, 1939–40
- Yugoslav Cup
  - Winners (1): 1938

Croatian football league system

- Croatian First League:
  - Winners (2): 1941, 1943
- Croatian Pokal:
  - Winners (1): 1941

=== Regional competitions ===
- Banovina of Croatia Championship:
  - Winners (1): 1939–40
- Zagreb Subassociation Championship:
  - Winners (8): 1920, 1922–23, 1923–24, 1924–25, 1925–26, 1927–28, 1942–43, 1943–1944
- Zagreb Subassociation Cup:
  - Winners (6): 1922–23, 1926–27, 1927–28, 1933–34, 1934–35, 1935–36

=== European competitions ===
- Mitropa Cup/Central European Cup:
  - Semi-finals (1): 1940

== Presidents ==
- Andrija Mutafelija (1911–1914)
- Artur Weintraub
- Vladimir Premrou (1932–1936)
- Josip Torbar (1936–1941)

== See also ==
- HAŠK Zagreb
- Concordia Zagreb
- Mitropa Cup
- Dinamo Zagreb
- Yugoslav First League
