= Dragutin Vrđuka =

Yugoslav footballer (1895–1948)

Personal information
- Date of birth: 3 April 1895
- Place of birth: Zagreb, Croatia-Slavonia, Austria-Hungary
- Date of death: 23 January 1948 (aged 52)
- Place of death: Zagreb, PR Croatia, FPR Yugoslavia
- Position: Goalkeeper

Senior career*
Years	Team	Apps	(Gls)
1918-1924	Građanski Zagreb	52	(1)

International career
1920–1924	Kingdom of SCS	7	(0)
- * Club domestic league appearances and goals

Dragutin Vrđuka (3 April 1895 – 23 January 1948) was a Yugoslav football goalkeeper. He was the first goalkeeper of the Yugoslavia national football team.

He played 15 games for the city squad of Zagreb, and seven games for the national team. On the club level he played for Građanski Zagreb. He died on 23 January 1948 from tuberculosis.

== International career ==
Vrđuka made his debut for Yugoslavia in an August 1920 Olympic Games match against Czechoslovakia and earned a total of 7 caps, scoring no goals. He played at both the 1920 Summer Olympics and the 1924 Summer Olympics. His final international was in May 1924 at that latter tournament against Uruguay. Remarkably, he both lost his first and last international game 7-0.
