= Ivan Jazbinšek =

Yugoslavian footballer (1914–1996)

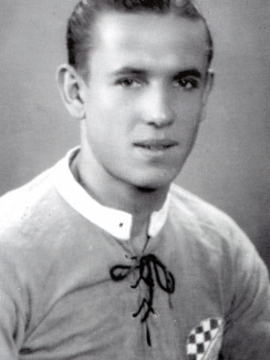
- Jazbinšek in the 1930s

Personal information
- Full name: Ivan Oskar Jazbinšek
- Date of birth: 9 August 1914
- Place of birth: Zagreb, Austria-Hungary
- Date of death: 28 June 1996 (aged 81)
- Place of death: Zagreb, Croatia
- Position: Defender

Youth career
- Meteor Zagreb
- Policijski Zagreb

Senior career*
Years	Team	Apps	(Gls)
1934–1935	BSK		
1936–1940	Građanski Zagreb	65	(0)
1945–1947	Metalac Zagreb		
1947–1950	Dinamo Zagreb	23	(0)

International career
1938–1941	Kingdom of Yugoslavia	7	(0)
1940	Banovina of Croatia	3	(0)
1941–1943	Independent State of Croatia	15	(0)

Managerial career
- 1952: NK Zagreb
- 1953–1955: Dinamo Zagreb
- 1955–1956: NK Zagreb
- 1956–1957: Hapoel Tel Aviv
- 1971: Toronto Croatia
Medal record
Association football
Representing Yugoslavia
Olympic Games
Silver medal – second place	1948 London	Team
- * Club domestic league appearances and goals

Ivan Jazbinšek (9 August 1914 – 28 June 1996) was a Croatian and Yugoslav footballer of Slovenian descent, who played as a defender.

== Club career ==
Jazbinšek started his career with Zagreb sides, ŠK Meteor and ŠK Policijski. After a short stint at BSK, he moved to top club HŠK Građanski Zagreb in 1935. With Građanski he won the 1937 and 1940 Yugoslav First League season, the 1943 Croatian First League and the 1948 Yugoslav Federal League. He stayed with Građanski until its disbanding by the communist regime in 1945. He later played for Metalac Zagreb and Dinamo Zagreb.

== International career ==
Jazbinšek played seven times for the Kingdom of Yugoslavia, making his debut for them in an April 1938 World Cup qualification match against Poland. After its demise, he played eighteen matches for the Independent State of Croatia, a World War II-era puppet state of Nazi Germany. He was also part of Yugoslavia's squad for the football tournament at the 1948 Summer Olympics, but he did not play in any matches.

His final international was an April 1944 friendly match against Slovakia.

== Managerial career ==
After his playing career he became a manager at NK Zagreb. He then moved on to become Dinamo's coach and won the Yugoslav Federal League in 1954. In 1971, he was appointed the head coach of Toronto Croatia in the National Soccer League, where he led Toronto to a NSL Championship and a Canadian Open Cup.
