= HŠK Ilirija =

Ilirija
- Full name: Hrvatski športski klub Ilirija
- Founded: 28 August 1909
- Dissolved: 1941

HŠK Ilirija was a Croatian football club formed in Zagreb. The club was founded on August 28, 1909, owing its name to the Illyrian movement. Throughout its existence the club played a major role in lower-tier local competitions, before it merged with other local clubs Tipografija and Slavija into HŠK Zvonimir in 1941.
