= Tuškanac =

Neighbourhood of Zagreb, Croatia

Coordinates: 45°49′17″N 15°58′12″E

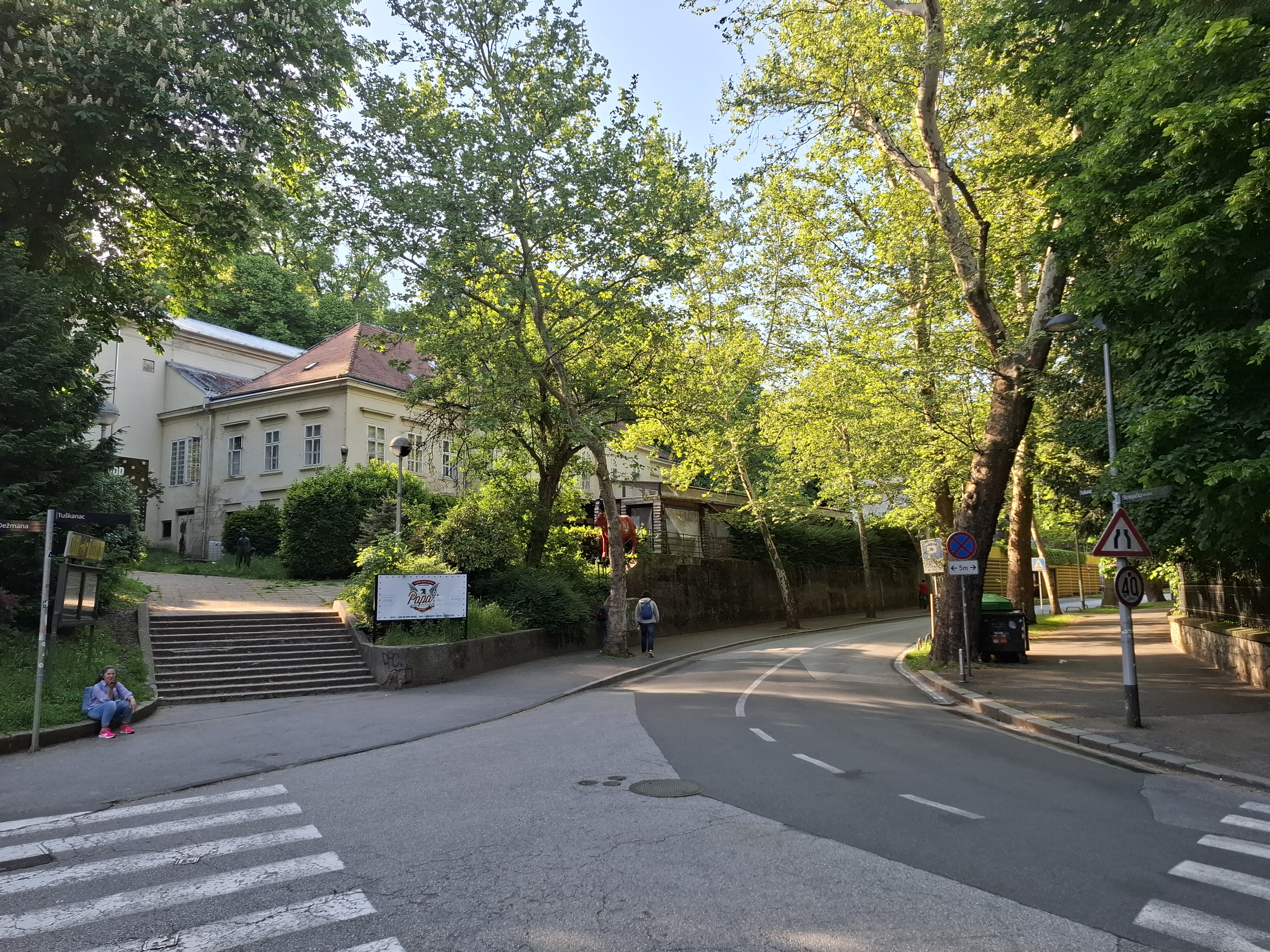
Southern entrance into the street of Tuškanac, with a view of Kino Tuškanac, 2025.

Tuškanac is a neighborhood located in Gornji Grad–Medveščak city district of Zagreb, Croatia. It has a population of 2,455 (2011). It is best known for its parks and Kino Tuškanac ('Tuškanac cinema').

Its name is derived from the name of Tuscany. There were Tuscan immigrants to Zagreb, some of whom have been recorded in the 14th century.

== Bibliography ==
=== Biology ===
- Šašić, Martina; Nahirnić, Ana; Tarmann, Gerhard M. (2016-12-31). "Zygaenidae (Lepidoptera) in the Lepidoptera collections of the Croatian Natural History Museum". Natura Croatica: Periodicum Musei Historiae Naturalis Croatici. 25 (2): 233–248. doi:10.20302/NC.2016.25.19. eISSN 1848-7386.
