= Zvonimir Cimermančić =

Croatian footballer (1917–1979)

Personal information
- Date of birth: 26 August 1917
- Place of birth: Zagreb, Austria-Hungary
- Date of death: 14 May 1979 (aged 61)
- Place of death: Zagreb, SFR Yugoslavia
- Positions: Defender; forward

Senior career*
Years	Team	Apps	(Gls)
1933–1934	Concordia Zagreb		
1935–1938	Slavija Varaždin		
1939–1945	Građanski Zagreb	116	(59)
1945–1949	Građanski Zagreb	68	(36)
1949–1950	Lokomotiva Zagreb		
1951–1954	Dinamo Zagreb	36	(10)

International career
1940	Banovina of Croatia	4	(0)
1940–1948	Yugoslavia	9	(3)
1941–1944	Independent State of Croatia	13	(0)
Medal record
Men's Football
Representing Yugoslavia
Olympic Games
Silver medal – second place	1948 London	Team
- * Club domestic league appearances and goals

Zvonimir Cimermančić (Croatian pronunciation: [zʋônimiːr tsîmermantʃitɕ]; 26 August 1917 – 17 May 1979) was a Croatian and Yugoslav footballer. He represented Yugoslavia at the 1948 Summer Olympics.

== Club career ==
He began his playing career with HŠK Građanski Zagreb's youth side before moving to NK Slavija Varaždin. In 1938 he returned to Građanski and in the following season won the Kingdom of Yugoslavia's last national championship. He played with Građanski in the Independent State of Croatia's First League until the state's demise and the club's disbanding at the end of the Second World War by Yugoslavian communists. He had become Croatian national champion with the club during the 1943 season. Afterwards, he played for NK Lokomotiva and Građanski's replacement regime-club NK Dinamo Zagreb.

== International career ==
Cimermančić has the distinction of having played for two FIFA-recognized national teams, three nations, and four national teams in all. In 1940, Cimermančić debuted for the Kingdom of Yugoslavia's national team (Beli Orlovi) and concurrently played four matches for the Banovina of Croatia's national team, which represented the Croatian statelet within the kingdom. With the establishment of the Independent State of Croatia and its respective national team, he suited up thirteen times and scored six goals for the country. After the war, he also played for communist Yugoslavia's national team. His final international was an August 1948 Olympic Games match against Sweden.

== Personal life ==
After his playing career, Cimermančić worked as a dentist. He died in a road accident in Zagreb in 1979 and is buried in Mirogoj Cemetery.
