= Stadion Kranjčevićeva =

Multi-purpose stadium in Zagreb, Croatia

Stadion u Kranjčevićevoj
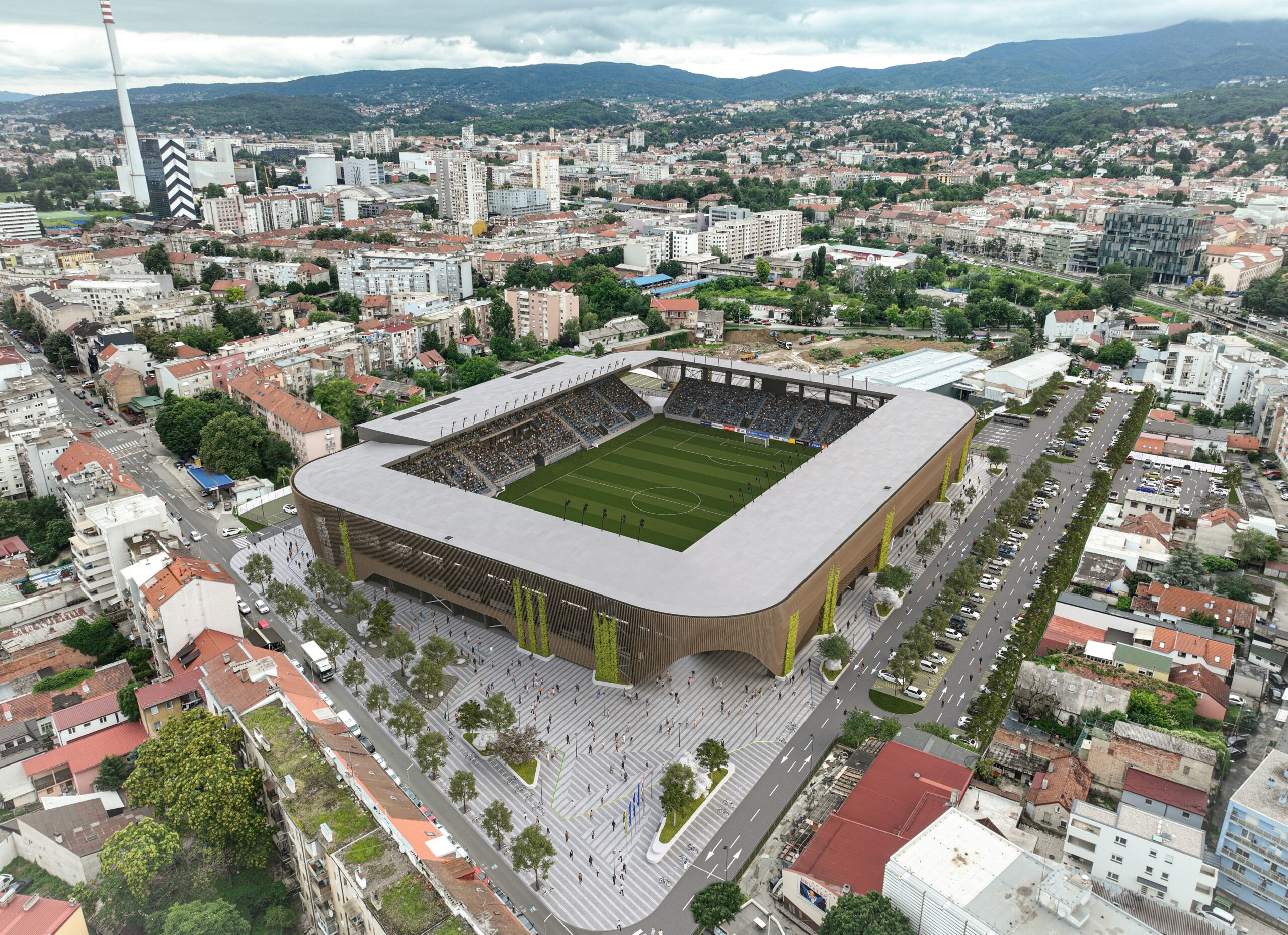
- Render of the new stadium
- Interactive map of Stadion u Kranjčevićevoj
- Full name: Stadion u Kranjčevićevoj ulici
- Former names: Stadion Concordia (1921–1945)
- Location: Zagreb, Croatia
- Coordinates: 45°48′17″N 15°57′39″E
- Owner: City of Zagreb
- Capacity: 11,163
- Surface: Hybrid grass
- Record attendance: 18,000 (Yugoslavia v. Germany, 15 October 1939)
- Field size: 105 m x 68 m (115 yd x 74 yd)

Construction
- Built: 1914, 1918–1921
- Opened: 1921
- Renovated: 1977, 1987, 2008, 2018, 2025-present
- Cost: €47 million

Tenants
- HŠK Concordia (1921–1945); NK Zagreb (1946–2018); NK Lokomotiva (2014–2025, 2026-); NK Rudeš (2017–2019, 2023–2024); NK Hrvatski Dragovoljac (2010–2011, 2013–2014, 2021–2022); 1987 Summer Universiade

Stadion u Kranjčevićevoj ulici (Kranjčević Street Stadium), also known as Stadion Concordia between 1921 and 1945, is a multi-purpose stadium located in Trešnjevka neighbourhood, in the Croatian capital of Zagreb.

As of 2025, the stadium is undergoing a complete reconstruction, with plans to give it an increased capacity of approximately 12,000 seats. Once completed, it will temporarily serve as the primary home ground for Dinamo Zagreb during the demolition and construction of the new Stadion Maksimir. In addition to hosting NK Lokomotiva, the revamped stadium will feature covered stands and improved spectator facilities.

The stadium's final match before demolition and rebuilding occurred on 22 April 2025, with HNK Šibenik defeating host Lokomotiva Zagreb.

It was historically the home ground of NK Zagreb until their eviction from the ground in 2018. More recently the stadium has been the home ground for Croatian First League side NK Lokomotiva. Other local teams, including NK Rudeš, Hrvatski Dragovoljac, and Sesvete have used the stadium for selected matches, particularly Croatian First League games.

First opened in 1921, it has undergone many renovations and facelifts, with its current layout dating back to the 1987 Summer Universiade renovation.

The Croatia national football team played only once at the stadium in a 3–0 friendly game win against South Korea on 13 March 1996.

Since its capacity was reduced in 2008, Stadion Kranjčevićeva can accommodate up to 8,850 spectators, making it the second-largest stadium in Zagreb after Stadion Maksimir. In 2018, the stadium underwent renovations, which included the installation of seats in the eastern grandstand and a new hybrid grass pitch. These upgrades reduced the seating capacity to 5,350.

== History ==
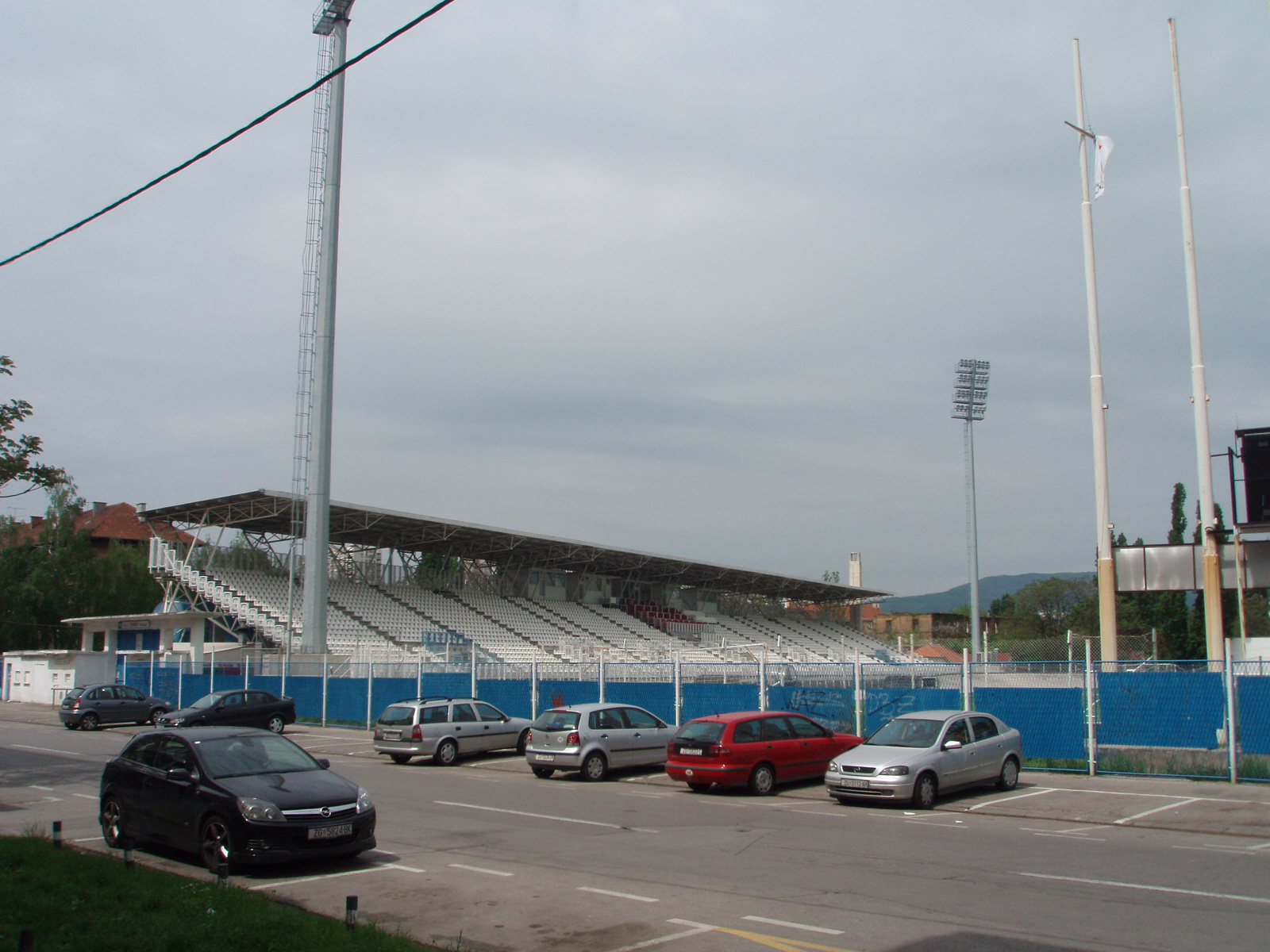
Stadium Kranjceviceva before demolition

The stadium at what was then called Tratinska cesta (English: Tratinska road) began construction in 1910s and was completed in 1921. At the time of its completion it was the biggest stadium in Zagreb and was owned by Concordia, one of the three prominent Zagreb-based football clubs in the interwar period (the other two being Građanski and HAŠK). In 1931 the first floodlit match held in Zagreb was played at the stadium, in which Zagreb XI beat Real Madrid 2–1, with two goals from Ico Hitrec and a consolation goal for Madrid scored by Eugenio.

After World War II, Concordia was disbanded for political reasons and the stadium was handed over to the newly formed Fiskulturno društvo Zagreb (English: Zagreb Sports Society), whose football section later evolved into today's NK Zagreb football club. NK Zagreb's third jersey is green in honour of Concordia, whose old stadium is now their own.

In November 1977 a large fire destroyed the west stand and in the following years the stadium went through several reconstructions and modifications. The most significant of these was an extensive overhaul and the construction of the adjoining facilities in preparation for the 1987 Summer Universiade. Later that year a lightning strike destroyed the floodlights during a match between NK Zagreb and NK Osijek and the stadium was without any floodlight capabilities for 20 years, until 2008, when the new ones were re-installed by the City of Zagreb.

=== Croatian War of Independence ===
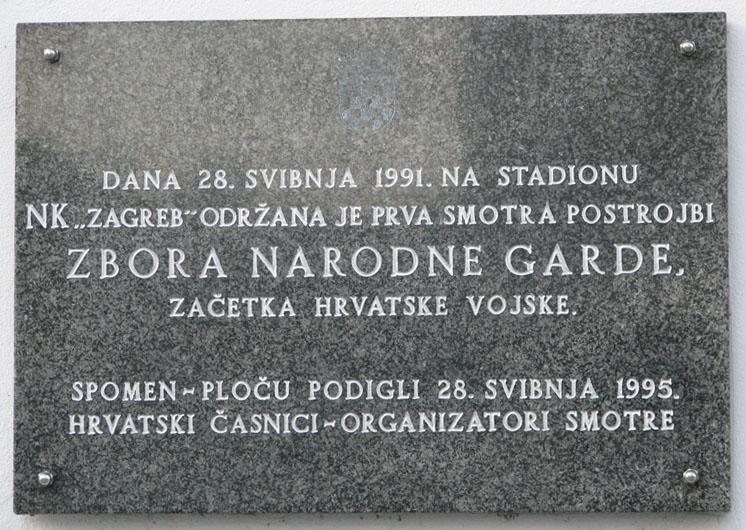
Plaque commemorating the 1991 Croatian National Guard parade.

One of the most significant dates in the history of the stadium occurred during the onset of the Croatian War of Independence. On 28 May 1991, the first public lineup of the Croatian National Guard (Croatian: Zbor narodne Garde) took place at the stadium. This unit, formed in April 1991, consisted of members of the police and parts of the Croatian army.

The Croatian National Guard was the first professional military unit in Croatia and later evolved into the Croatian Ground Army (Croatian: Hrvatska kopnena vojska). This event marked the beginning of the creation of the Croatian Armed Forces.

A commemorative plaque honoring this historic event can be seen at the stadium entrance.

== Structure ==
Today's shape and form of the venue in Kranjčevićeva Street is a result of another unfortunate event in its history. On 29 November 1977, a fire destroyed large sections of the old wooden western stand of the stadium. Since then, the stadium has undergone several modifications and reconstructions over the years.

Most of the current infrastructure was built in preparation for the Universiade held in Zagreb, the world's Student Games. This included an extensive overhaul of the venue and the construction of adjoining facilities.

Later in 1987, a lightning strike damaged the floodlights, leaving the stadium without floodlight capabilities for 20 years. New floodlights were finally installed by the City of Zagreb in 2008.

The stadium now consists of two stands. The west stand is fully seated and has a capacity of 3,850 spectators. It also houses the press box and the VIP area. The east stand has 5,000 standing places and is primarily used for traveling fans. Additionally, the stadium features a cycling track around the pitch, used for track cycling events. It also includes a wheelchair area.

In June 2008, a UEFA inspection visited the stadium to assess its licensing suitability. While the stadium received some praise for its central location in Zagreb, the inspection highlighted several shortcomings, such as the lack of floodlights and inadequate facilities for journalists. Despite these issues, the stadium managed to receive a 3-star rating out of five, ranking it among the better stadiums in Croatia.

Following this inspection, the City of Zagreb undertook significant renovations through June, July, and August 2008. The floodlights were reinstalled and became operational just three days before the 5th round match between NK Zagreb and NK Osijek on 24 August 2008. Zagreb secured a 2–1 victory in their first match under the new floodlights, with goals from Mario Čutura and Davor Vugrinec in the last minute, witnessed by 2,500 supporters. Since the installation of the new floodlights, the stadium has been capable of hosting both daytime and nighttime matches.

In 2018, the stadium underwent further refurbishment. Chairs were installed in the eastern grandstand, and a new hybrid lawn was added. The stadium's seating capacity was 5,350 seats after these refurbishments.

=== Reconstruction ===
The final confirmation for the reconstruction of the stadium in Kranjčevićeva Street was announced by Zagreb's mayor, Tomislav Tomašević, in November 2024. This followed an earlier announcement in October 2023 during a City Assembly session, where the need for the project was first outlined. The reconstruction was deemed essential to provide a temporary home for Dinamo Zagreb and the Croatia national football team during the planned demolition and redevelopment of Maksimir Stadium, expected to be completed by 2028.

The project started in April 2025 with the demolition of the old stadium. The reconstruction is expected to last 15 to 18 months, with completion scheduled for September 2026.

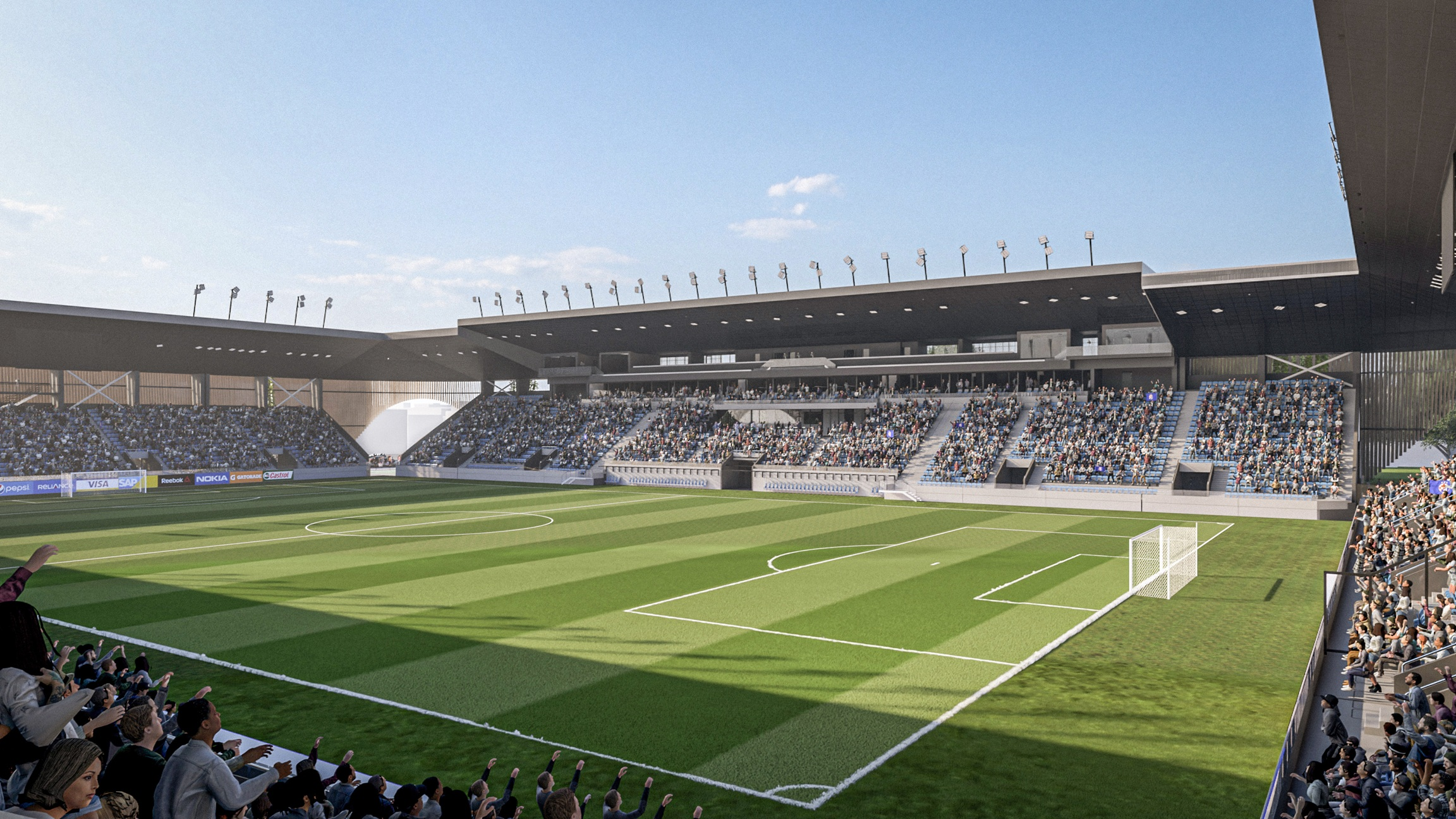
Interior of the New Stadium Kranjceviceva

The upgraded stadium will have a capacity of 11,163 seats, increasing from its current 5,350, and will meet UEFA's Category 4 standards. This will enable it to host high-profile matches, including UEFA Champions League and UEFA Europa League games up to the semifinal stage.

Planned upgrades include fully covered stands, modern LED lighting to replace the outdated floodlights, and a hybrid heated pitch. Facilities for players, staff, and technical support will also be upgraded to comply with modern professional football standards.

The surrounding area will also undergo significant redevelopment. A 6,300-square-meter plaza will be built in front of the stadium, replacing existing walls to create a more accessible and pedestrian-friendly environment. Deputy Mayor Luka Korlaet highlighted that the project will transform the area by providing space for pedestrians and cyclists, while integrating the stadium into the urban landscape.

The original conceptual design was developed by Sirrah projekt d.o.o., which is also responsible for designing NK Osijek's state-of-the-art Opus Arena. Mayor Tomašević described the project as the first major stadium development in Zagreb in nearly 50 years. While technically a reconstruction, the scale of the upgrades makes it comparable to building a completely new stadium.

Deputy Mayor Luka Korlaet emphasized the urban impact of the project, noting that the reconstruction is designed to address long-standing spatial challenges in the area. The removal of walls around the stadium and the creation of the plaza will enhance accessibility and contribute to a more pedestrian-friendly environment. "The stadium is designed as a single architectural body, beautifully integrated into the surrounding urban fabric," Korlaet explained.

The project is expected to cost €44 million, including VAT, and will be entirely funded by the city of Zagreb. The initial estimate of €20 million was revised due to rising construction costs over the past three years. Tomašević emphasized that the updated cost is reasonable and aligns with similar projects in Europe. He also highlighted the importance of the investment, noting that the reconstruction of Kranjčevićeva is a crucial step toward enabling the redevelopment of Maksimir Stadium.

The project marks a significant milestone for Zagreb's sporting infrastructure. With its expanded capacity and modern facilities, the reconstructed stadium will be capable of hosting international sporting events, providing a vital resource for Croatian football and other events. Additionally, its timely completion will ensure that it serves as a temporary home for Dinamo Zagreb and the Croatia national football team while Maksimir Stadium undergoes redevelopment.

== International matches ==
The first international match at the stadium was held in June 1922, a friendly between Kingdom of Yugoslavia and Czechoslovakia. The Yugoslavia team consisted almost entirely of players called up from Zagreb clubs (only the goalkeeper Rodoljub Malenčić was called up from Belgrade's SK Jugoslavija) and Yugoslavia went on to win the game 4–3, with some 6,000 people in attendance. Between 1922 and 1940 the stadium hosted a total of 11 Kingdom of Yugoslavia matches, most of them friendlies. During World War II, the Independent State of Croatia formed a national team which used the stadium for six games, all of them friendlies played with other Axis powers' puppet states.

In 1947 Kranjčevićeva hosted their single international game in the SFR Yugoslavia period, a 2–1 Balkan Cup win against Bulgaria, with both Yugoslavia's goals scored by Prvoslav Mihajlović. Following Croatia's independence in 1991, the Croatia national football team played at Kranjčevićeva only once, in a 1996 friendly against South Korea which Croatia won 3–0 through a hat-trick from Goran Vlaović.

=== List of matches ===
#	Date	Competition	Opponent	Score	Att.	Ref
Kingdom of Yugoslavia (1920–41)
1.	28-06-1922	Friendly	Czechoslovakia	4–3	6,000	
2.	10-02-1924	Friendly	Austria	1–4	10,000	
3.	28-09-1924	Friendly	Czechoslovakia	0–2	8,000	
4.	28-06-1926	Friendly	Czechoslovakia	2–6	10,000	
5.	03-10-1926	Friendship Cup	Romania	2–3	5,000	
6.	08-04-1928	Friendly	Turkey	2–1	5,000	
7.	28-06-1929	Friendly	Czechoslovakia	3–3	8,000	
8.	06-08-1933	Friendly	Czechoslovakia	2–1	3,000	
9.	28-05-1938	Friendship Cup	Czechoslovakia	1–3	10,000	
10.	15-10-1939	Friendly	Germany	1–5	18,000	
11.	03-11-1940	Friendly	Germany	2–0	15,000	
Independent State of Croatia (1941–45)
12.	28-09-1941	Friendly	Slovakia	5–2	12,000	
13.	18-01-1942	Friendly	Germany	0–2	12,000	
14.	12-04-1942	Friendly	Bulgaria	6–0	15,000	
15.	06-09-1942	Friendly	Slovakia	6–1	9,000	
16.	10-04-1943	Friendly	Slovakia	1–0	10,000	
17.	09-04-1944	Friendly	Slovakia	7–3	8,000	
SFR Yugoslavia (1946–92)
18.	12-10-1947	Balkan Cup	Bulgaria	2–1	15,000	
Croatia (1992–present)
19.	13-03-1996	Friendly	South Korea	3–0	3,000	

== Average attendances ==
The average season attendances from league matches held at the Stadion u Kranjčevićevoj for NK Zagreb

Season	Average attendance
1992	3,773
1992–93	5,467
1993–94	2,706
1994–95	3,100
1995–96	2,767
1996–97	1,633
1997–98	1,820
1998–99	1,547
1999–00	1,106
2000–01	1,831
2001–02	2,800
2002–03	1,830
2003–04	1,569
2004–05	1,831
2005–06	1,469
2006–07	1,965
2007–08	1,200
2008–09	867
2009–10	1,240
2010–11	1,121
2011–12	933
2012–13	1,263

== See also ==
- List of football stadiums in Croatia
