= HŠK Concordia =

- Full name: Hrvatski športski klub Concordia
- Founded: 10 October 1906
- Dissolved: 1945
- Ground: Stadion Concordije
- Capacity: 12,000
Home colours	Away colours

HŠK Concordia was a Croatian football club formed in Zagreb. The club was founded as the Srednjoškolski športski klub in 1906.

By the end of the First World War the club had played many matches with both domestic and foreign clubs. After the war, the prewar members along with the members of HŠK Viktorija re-formed the club as Concordia-Viktorija (quickly renamed Concordia).

One of the most importants acts by the club was the building of a stadium on Tratinska cesta (today's Stadion u Kranjčevićevoj), then the biggest in Zagreb. It was finished in 1921. The Yugoslavia national football team played eleven matches at the club's grounds.

Apart from football, the club also competed in athletics, skiing, field hockey and table tennis. The club's most famous footballers were Pavelić, Babić, Ivan Belošević, Jazbec, Monsider, Pavletić, Aleksandar Živković, Kodrnja and Karlo Muradori. The club played in both the Yugoslav and Croatian leagues. In 1945 it was renamed Zeleni 1906. NK Zagreb's third jersey is green in honour of Concordia, whose old stadium is now their own.

== Accomplishments ==
- Kingdom of Yugoslavia Championship
  - 1930, 1932
- Croatian First League
  - 1942
- Croatian Cup
  - Finalist: 1941

== Club presidents ==
- Ervin Rosmanith (1906–11)
- J. Reberski (1912–22)
- Roman Rosmanith (1923)
- M. Pajnić (1924)
- M. Bosnić (1925–32)
- L. Thaller (1933–40)
