= List of Serbian football champions =

The Serbian football champions indicates all past winners of the top-tier football leagues in which clubs from Serbian were inserted in. It includes the Serbian SuperLiga and chronologically all the predecessor leagues. Serbia is considered by FIFA and UEFA to be the only official successor of both the Yugoslavia and Serbia and Montenegro national teams, and competitions

== History ==
Football first came to Kingdom of Serbia in the late 1890s but the first organised championships started being played after 1918, when the country was already part of the Kingdom of Yugoslavia. They were organised by the Serbian Football Association and had two editions: 1919-20 and 1920-21. In the meantime in Croatia a separate league was also being played, and all agreed to begin with a Yugoslav National Championship in 1923.

The Yugoslav Football Championship was played until the beginning of the Second World War. The only interruption happened in 1929 due to disagreements between the sub-associations of Belgrade and Zagreb when the Yugoslav Football Association Assembly was dissolved. Its last edition before the war was the 1939–40 season. In the following season and during the war, a separate Serbian and Croatian leagues were played.

At the end of the war the new authorities formed, disbanded and renamed numerous clubs, and the first season, the 1945 Yugoslav Football Tournament, was played by representative teams, instead of clubs, however, since the 1946–47, the old league model played between the top national clubs was restored. The Yugoslav First League was played without interruptions, being the top league of the Socialist Yugoslavia. However, the league suffered changes with the breaking-up of the country by the early 1990s. The last season in which the clubs from Croatia and Slovenia competed was the 1990–91. The following season, 1991–92 was the last in which clubs from Bosnia and Herzegovina and Macedonia competed. All these 4 former Yugoslav Republics became independent, and they formed their own separate football leagues.

The league was named, just as the country, to First League of FR Yugoslavia and was formed of clubs from Serbia and Montenegro, although a club from Bosnia, FK Borac Banja Luka kept on playing in the FR Yugoslav league system. As the country changed its name again in 2003, the league was renamed to First League of Serbia and Montenegro. In 2006 Montenegro declared independence, so Montenegrin clubs formed their own league, leaving the newly named SuperLiga formed only with clubs from Serbia.

== Champions and statistics ==
=== Unofficial champions of Serbia ===
Despite an absence of a real championship, the fact is that at that the public and the press had a clear perception about the best club in each period. This was archived by the number of matches and the results of the clubs, and the press had an easy way of distinguishing about who was the best team, or title holder (named in the press by using the German expression "Meister Manschaft") and who were the pretenders.

Period	Champions
1903–1907	SK Soko Beograd
1907–1911	Šumadija Kragujevac
1911–1912	BSK Beograd
1912	Srpski mač
1912	BSK Beograd
1913–1914	SK Soko Beograd
1914–1918	Srpski mač

=== Serbian Olympic Cup ===
In spring of 1914 the Serbian Olympic Committee organised the first ever trophy to be played among the best football clubs of the Kingdom of Serbia. It was played in a single-round robin system, and it was won in the final held in Belgrade by SK Velika Srbija.

This seemed to be a promising start of an organised football tournament to be held regularly, however later that same year, the Assassination in Sarajevo of the Austrian Prince Franz Ferdinand by a Serbian revolutionary opposing the Austro-Hungarian annexation of Bosnia and Herzegovina, led to the Austro-Hungarian declaration of war against Serbia. The consequence of this event was the beginning of the First World War in which Serbia will suffer major human losses and which completely put in hold the development of sport activities in the kingdom.

Season	Format	Champions	Runners up	Top scorer(s)	Goals
1914	Cup (Single round-robin)	Velika Srbija	Šumadija Kragujevac		

=== Serbian Football Championship ===
At the end of the First World War in 1918, and with the victory of Serbia and the rest of the Allies, the country suffered major territorial changes. Already before the war Serbia included what is the present-day territory of North Macedonia. In October 1918, Syrmia, Vojvodina and the Kingdom of Montenegro unite with Serbia, and finally, in November, the State of Slovenes, Croats and Serbs, a shortly lived state formed by the South Slavic inhabited territories of the now dismembered Austro-Hungary, joins as well. The Kingdom of Serbs, Croats and Slovenes is proclaimed in Belgrade under the Karađorđević dynasty and is considered a legal successor of the Kingdom of Serbia.

This new enlarged territory composing now different ethnicities and in which football presented different levels of development in different areas, presented a real challenge for a unified football championship to be organised. The possibility that arise was that each of the subassociations starts developing their own internal competitions. The Belgrade Football Subassociation created a first tournament in which the final-phase will be played in 1920 and which had the participation of the clubs from the territory covering what was the former Kingdom of Serbia, Vojvodina and the Semberija region, which nowadays corresponds to the north eastern part of Bosnia and Herzegovina. It held two editions and both of them were won by BSK Belgrade.

Season	Format	Champions	Runners up	Top scorer(s)	Goals
1919-20	League (One round-robin; 5 clubs)	BSK Beograd	Jugoslavija Beograd		
1920-21	League (Double round-robin; 6 clubs)	BSK Beograd	Jugoslavija Beograd		
1921-22	League (One round-robin; 9 clubs)	Jugoslavija Beograd	Vardar Beograd		

=== Yugoslav Football Championship ===
This period was dominated by two clubs, Serbian BSK and Croatian Građanski, both of which won 5 titles each. They were followed by Croatian side Hajduk Split, and Serbian side Jugoslavija, each with 2 titles. Beside them, Croatian clubs Concordia and HAŠK won one championship. Geographically, Belgrade and Zagreb dominated this period with 7 titles each, with Split taking one.

In total, the title won by Hajduk Split made the difference, making Croatian teams to win one more title than Serbian ones, with Croatia having 8 titles, and Serbia 7. This was no surprise, as football in Croatia had been slightly more developed, as it has been introduced earlier than in Serbia, while Zagreb and Split were still part of the Austro-Hungarian Empire, known at that time as the Central European school, the worldwide avant-garde of football. In comparison, football in Serbia was introduced a bit latter, mostly brought by students coming from Austro-Hungarian urban centers like Vienna, Budapest, Prague or Zagreb where football was already developed as sport. Despite that fact, the period was marked by the immediate appearance of a growing rivalry between Croatian and Serbian clubs as soon as the championship on national level begin in 1923.

Although initially on continental level the Yugoslav clubs had been generally inferior in their clashes against stronger Central European clubs in the Mitropa Cup, usually being eliminated in the first rounds, by the late 1930s Građanski and BSK managed to make better performances reaching intermediate stages of the competition.

Because initially Zagreb was a more developed city regarding football organisation, the Yugoslav Football Association was formed there in 1919, however as Belgrade was the country capital, the FA moved in 1930 after major insistence from Belgrade Football Subassociation. This led to the boycott on behalf of Zagreb Football Subassociation which then refused to send their players, which were the majority in the national team prior to that event, to represent Yugoslavia at the 1930 FIFA World Cup. Even so, the national team, formed only with domestic players playing in Belgrade-based clubs impressed by reaching the semi-finals, thus making the first major result for the national team at international level.

Regarding players in the league, Serbian clubs dominated in the top-scorer statistic, with the season top-scorer playing on 11 out of 17 occasions in a Serbian club, with the other 6 being players from Croatian-based clubs. This period was also marked by the fact that most major clubs made an effort to bring experienced foreign coaches (some were even coaches/players) mostly from Czechoslovakia, Austria, Hungary and England. There was also a number of foreign players, mostly from Central European countries who were initially more technically and tactically skilled, although domestic players progressively substantially improved their quality with time. In 1924 BSK brought the first foreign professional footballers when they brought Rudolf Wetzer and Dezideriu Laki from Romania.

Season	Format	Champions	Runners up	Top scorer(s)	Goals
1923	Cup tournament (Single round-robin; 6 clubs)	Građanski Zagreb	SAŠK Sarajevo	Dragan Jovanović (Jugoslavija Beograd)	4
1924	Cup tournament (Single round-robin; 7 clubs)	Jugoslavija Beograd	Hajduk Split	Dragan Jovanović (Jugoslavija Beograd)	6
1925	Cup tournament (Single round-robin; 7 clubs)	Jugoslavija Beograd	Građanski Zagreb	Dragan Jovanović (Jugoslavija Beograd)	4
1926	Cup tournament (Single round-robin; 7 clubs)	Građanski Zagreb	Jugoslavija Beograd	Dušan Petković (Jugoslavija Beograd)	4
1927	League (Single round-robin; 6 clubs)	Hajduk Split	BSK Beograd	Kuzman Sotirović (BSK Beograd)	6
1928	League (Single round-robin; 6 clubs)	Građanski Zagreb	Hajduk Split	Ljubo Benčić (Hajduk Split)	8
1929	League (Double round-robin; 5 clubs)	Hajduk Split	BSK Beograd	Đorđe Vujadinović (BSK Beograd)	10
1930	League (Double round-robin; 6 clubs)	Concordia Zagreb	Jugoslavija Beograd	Blagoje Marjanović (BSK Beograd)	10
1930–31	League (Double round-robin; 6 clubs)	BSK Beograd	Concordia Zagreb	Đorđe Vujadinović (BSK Beograd)	12
1931–32	Cup tournament (Double round-robin; 8 clubs)	Concordia Zagreb	Hajduk Split	Svetislav Valjarević (Concordia Zagreb)	10
1932–33	League (Double round-robin; 11 clubs)	BSK Beograd	Hajduk Split	Vladimir Kragić (Hajduk Split)	21
1933–34	National championship was not played.				
1934–35	League (Double round-robin; 10 clubs)	BSK Beograd	Jugoslavija Beograd	Leo Lemešić (Hajduk Split)	18
1935–36	Cup tournament (Double round-robin; 14 clubs)	BSK Beograd	Slavija Sarajevo	Blagoje Marjanović (BSK Beograd)	5
1936–37	League (Double round-robin; 10 clubs)	Građanski Zagreb	Hajduk Split	Blagoje Marjanović (BSK Beograd)	21
1937–38	League (Double round-robin; 10 clubs)	HAŠK Zagreb	BSK Beograd	August Lešnik (Građanski Zagreb)	17
1938–39	League (Double round-robin; 12 clubs)	BSK Beograd	Građanski Zagreb	August Lešnik (Građanski Zagreb)	22
1939–40	League (Double round-robin; 6 clubs)	Građanski Zagreb	BSK Beograd	Svetislav Glišović (BSK Beograd)	10

=== Serbian League ===
By the end of the 1930s the political tensions and rivalry between Serbs and Croats within the Kingdom of Yugoslavia reached its peak, and this was also reflected in football with the creation of two separate leagues in 1939, the Serbian one, and the Croatian-Slovenian, with the top classified teams in both of them qualifying to a national final stage to decide the national champion. However, in the following season, Slovenia separated and formed its own league, thus having now three leagues, Croatian, Serbian and Slovenian, which would serve as qualifying leagues to the final stage where the national champion would be decided. During that season, 1940–41, the Serbian League included the clubs from the Subassociations of Belgrade, Novi Sad, Subotica, Zrenjanin, Kragujevac, Niš, Skoplje, Sarajevo, Banja Luka and Cetinje, which territorially comprised all of current-day Serbia, North Macedonia, Montenegro, Bosnia and Herzegovina and a minor portion of the Eastern part of Slavonia, along the Danube River, nowadays in Croatia. However, due to the start of the Second World War, this final stage at national level was never played.

After the Axis invasion of Yugoslavia in April 1941, the country entered into war and was set apart, with several portions of its territory being annexed by Axis-allied neighbours and the Nazi puppet state of Independent State of Croatia was created. In Serbia, the rest of the territory which was not under direct occupation by some of its neighbours became known as the Serbian military administration and was under direct control by the German military authority. Even so, a domestic league was organised in the territory until 1944. The league was set as the continuation of the Serbian League played in 1940-41 which was won then by BSK, who will win the title as well in 1943 and 1944. BSK had already been a dominant club domestically during the 1930s. SK Jugoslavija, renamed by then to SK 1913 because of political reasons as German authorities intended to put an end to what has been Yugoslavia and which the club's name was inspired in, won the title in 1942, having finished second in all other editions. At this period, Serbian clubs absorbed numerous players that arrived from other parts of the country which was being devastated by the war.

Season	Champions	Runners up	Third place	Top scorer(s)	Goals
1939-40	BSK Beograd	Jugoslavija Beograd	Slavija Sarajevo		
1940-41	BSK Beograd	Jugoslavija Beograd	Vojvodina Novi Sad		
1941-42	Jugoslavija Beograd	BSK Beograd	Vitez Beograd		
1942-43	BSK Beograd	Jugoslavija Beograd	Obilić		
1943-44	BSK Beograd	Jugoslavija Beograd	Obilić		

=== People's Republic of Serbia League ===
Season	Champions	Runners up	Third place	Top scorer(s)	Goals
1946	Red Star	Železničar Niš	Metalac Belgrade		

=== Yugoslav First League ===
After the end of the Second World War, the country was restored however it became a socialist country with the victorious Partisan's guerilla leader, Josip Broz Tito, as its new head-of-state. The multi-partidarian system was abolished and the Communist Party became the only existing political movement. In football, the new authorities abolished all clubs that had a monarchic or bourgeois connotation and most of the ones that kept their activity under occupation. In Serbia the major impact was the disestablishment of the major clubs, among them BSK and Jugoslavija. Although BSK will be revived as OFK Beograd, and will even restore its name BSK between 1950 and 1957, it will only be recognised as same club after the end of the socialist period. Its stadium and most of its property will be attributed to a newly formed club, FK Partizan, which was formed as the Yugoslav Army club. SK Jugoslavija stadium and its property, just as most of its players, will be attributed to the newly formed Red Star Belgrade which was unofficially the club of the Ministry of Interior. Football became a formidable tool to the regime which made it a forefront of diplomacy. Yugoslav clubs and players crisscrossed the globe, from Western Europe to Asia and Africa, doing their bit to nurture ties around globe, something which would be exploited by the government in its propagation of the Non-Aligned policies. Domestically, football provided entertainment for millions, and it developed into an industry that, like the rest of the economy, exhibited many of the traits of the capitalist West, alongside the unique features of the Yugoslav self-menagment socialism. In this period football became a valuable asset to the authorities and enjoyed mass appeal.

In this period between 1945 and 1992, the newly formed Belgrade clubs Red Star and Partizan will dominate the league. Although the rivalry between Serbian and Croatian clubs was kept, and will be particularly intense during the last years before the break-up of the country when the ethnic tensions were high, the number of championships won by Belgrade clubs was much higher and proportionally increased in comparison with the pre-1945 period when the relation was balanced. In total, in this period, Red Star won most of the championships, 19, with Partizan being in second place with 11, Hajduk Split won 7 and Dinamo Zagreb, the successor of pre-1945 Građanski, 4. Another Serbian club, FK Vojvodina won 2 titles, and this period was also characterised by the appearance of clubs from Bosnia and Herzegovina as championship winning teams, with FK Sarajevo winning 2, and FK Željezničar, also from Sarajevo, winning one. In the first post war season, in 1945, a league was played based on teams representing Republics, where SR Serbia won the title. This meant that geographically, Serbian teams had together 33 titles out of 47 seasons (meaning 70.2% of titles), with Croatian having 11 (23.5%), and Bosnian 3 titles. By city, Belgrade based clubs took 30 titles, in second place was Split with 7, third Zagreb with 4, fourth Sarajevo with 3 and finally Novi Sad with 2.

Despite the statistics, this period was characterised by the existence of the "Big 4" (Velika četvorka), a colloquial name attributed to the four larger clubs in the country, Red Star, Partizan, Hajduk Split and Dinamo Zagreb which usually represented the country at continental level. This period was marked by the appearance of first major international successes on club level. Serbian clubs made the best results, along with Croatian Dinamo Zagreb. The first to make a way to European final was Dinamo Zagreb who lost the 1963 Inter-Cities Fairs Cup Final. The next was Partizan, who in 1966 reached the European Cup final, losing to Real Madrid by 2-1 after winning by 1-0 until the 70th minute. In the following season, Dinamo Zagreb became the first Yugoslav club to actually win a European title, by winning the 1966–67 Inter-Cities Fairs Cup. Then it was Red Star who reached the final of the 1978–79 UEFA Cup, but the actual cherry on the top of the cake was the conquest by Red Star of the 1990–91 European Cup becoming the European club champion, and subsequently the World champion after winning the 1991 Intercontinental Cup. Hajduk Split, OFK Belgrade and Radnički Niš also made impressive results by reaching the semi-finals in European competitions. Beside this, in this period the Mitropa Cup was won by Red Star (2x 1958 and 1968), Čelik Zenica (2x 1971 and 1972), Vojvodina (1977), Partizan (1978), Iskra Bugojno (1985) and Borac Banja Luka (1992). The Balkans Cup was won by Radnički Niš (1975), Dinamo Zagreb (1976), NK Rijeka (1978) and Velež Mostar (1981).

The domestic league was usually ranked among the top 10 in Europe and this level of domestic competition had produced a high number of skilled professional footballers. The national team greatly benefited from it, with Yugoslavia making numerous appearances at World and European final phases. The best results in this period were the 4th place in the 1962 FIFA World Cup, and the second place in the 1960 and 1968 European Championship. Yugoslavia was the organiser of the 1976 UEFA European Football Championship which was played in Belgrade and Zagreb and in which Yugoslavia ended in a, disappointing by then, 4th place. Yugoslavia had good results in youth levels as well, with the note going to the winning of the 1987 FIFA World Youth Championship. The Olympic record is impressive, with the country winning the gold in 1960, the silver in 1942, 1952 and 1956, and the bronze in 1984. Yugoslavia also won the gold in the 1971 and 1979 Mediterranean Games with the second having Split as host of the event.

Serbia became the Republic who had the larger number of capped players in the senior national team, although that was natural as it was the Republic with higher number of inhabitants, with Croatia being actually the Republic who had proportionally the best relation with number of inhabitants/number of national team players. The player with most appearances for the national team was the Serb Dragan Džajić, a Red Star legend, and among the top 10 topscorers in the First League between 1946 and 1996, 8 of them played in Serbian clubs, with the all-time league top-scorer being a Serb Slobodan Santrač who represented all Belgrade-based clubs: OFK Beograd, Partizan and Galenika Zemun. Of the 57 seasonal top-scorers, 32 accomplished it while playing for Serbian clubs.

This period was marked by the recognition of full-time professionalism of the top division in 1967. Numerous domestic players had successful careers abroad as well. The league was formed almost exclusively with domestic players for most of the time, with the characteristic of the major clubs bringing players from medium and minor size clubs from different regions of the country. This specially became notorious during the 1980s when Red Star established a hegemonic position by acquiring the most talented footballers from other teams in the country. After WWII there was an abrupt decrease in foreign players, and with few exceptions, they will only return as noticeable factor in the 1980s. Then some top-level clubs started importing players, mostly from neighbouring countries, but also from Australia, Africa and Latin and North America. The curiosity was that with the fall of the Berlin Wall, numerous players from the former Communist countries joined lower-level clubs.

Season	Champions	Runners up	Third place	Top scorer(s)	Goals
1945	SR Serbia	JNA	SR Croatia	Stjepan Bobek (JNA)	8
1946–47	Partizan	Dinamo Zagreb	Red Star	Franjo Wölfl (Dinamo Zagreb)	28
1947–48	Dinamo Zagreb	Hajduk Split	Partizan	Franjo Wölfl (Dinamo Zagreb)	22
1948–49	Partizan	Red Star	Hajduk Split	Frane Matošić (Hajduk Split)	17
1950	Hajduk Split	Red Star	Partizan	Marko Valok (Partizan)	17
1951	Red Star	Dinamo Zagreb	Hajduk Split	Kosta Tomašević (Red Star)	16
1952	Hajduk Split	Red Star	Lokomotiva Zagreb	Stanoje Jocić (BSK Belgrade)	13
1952–53	Red Star	Hajduk Split	Partizan	Todor Živanović (Red Star)	17
1953–54	Dinamo Zagreb	Partizan	Red Star	Stjepan Bobek (Partizan)	21
1954–55	Hajduk Split	BSK Belgrade	Dinamo Zagreb	Predrag Marković (BSK Belgrade); Kosta Tomašević (Spartak); Bernard Vukas (Hajduk Split)	20
1955–56	Red Star	Partizan	Radnički Belgrade	Muhamed Mujić (Velež Mostar); Tihomir Ognjanov (Spartak); Todor Veselinović (Vojvodina)	21
1956–57	Red Star	Vojvodina	Hajduk Split	Todor Veselinović (Vojvodina)	28
1957–58	Dinamo Zagreb	Partizan	Radnički Belgrade	Todor Veselinović (Vojvodina)	19
1958–59	Red Star	Partizan	Vojvodina	Bora Kostić (Red Star)	25
1959–60	Red Star	Dinamo Zagreb	Partizan	Bora Kostić (Red Star)	19
1960–61	Partizan	Red Star	Hajduk Split	Zoran Prljinčević (Radnički Belgrade); Todor Veselinović (Vojvodina)	16
1961–62	Partizan	Vojvodina	Dinamo Zagreb	Dražan Jerković (Dinamo Zagreb)	16
1962–63	Partizan	Dinamo Zagreb	Željezničar	Mišo Smajlović (Željezničar)	18
1963–64	Red Star	OFK Belgrade	Dinamo Zagreb	Asim Ferhatović (FK Sarajevo)	19
1964–65	Partizan	FK Sarajevo	Red Star	Zlatko Dračić (NK Zagreb)	23
1965–66	Vojvodina	Dinamo Zagreb	Velež Mostar	Petar Nadoveza (Hajduk Split)	21
1966–67	FK Sarajevo	Dinamo Zagreb	Partizan	Mustafa Hasanagić (Partizan)	18
1967–68	Red Star	Partizan	Dinamo Zagreb	Slobodan Santrač (OFK Belgrade)	22
1968–69	Red Star	Dinamo Zagreb	Partizan	Vojin Lazarević (Red Star)	22
1969–70	Red Star	Partizan	Velež Mostar	Slobodan Santrač (OFK Belgrade); Dušan Bajević (Velež Mostar)	20
1970–71	Hajduk Split	Željezničar	Dinamo Zagreb	Petar Nadoveza (Hajduk Split); Božo Janković (Željezničar)	20
1971–72	Željezničar	Red Star	OFK Belgrade	Slobodan Santrač (OFK Belgrade)	33
1972–73	Red Star	Velež Mostar	OFK Belgrade	Slobodan Santrač (OFK Belgrade); Vojin Lazarević (Red Star)	25
1973–74	Hajduk Split	Velež Mostar	Red Star	Danilo Popivoda (Olimpija Ljubljana)	17
1974–75	Hajduk Split	Vojvodina	Red Star	Dušan Savić (Red Star); Boško Đorđević (Partizan)	20
1975–76	Partizan	Hajduk Split	Dinamo Zagreb	Nenad Bjeković (Partizan)	24
1976–77	Red Star	Dinamo Zagreb	Sloboda Tuzla	Zoran Filipović (Red Star)	21
1977–78	Partizan	Red Star	Hajduk Split	Radomir Savić (FK Sarajevo)	21
1978–79	Hajduk Split	Dinamo Zagreb	Red Star	Dušan Savić (Red Star)	24
1979–80	Red Star	FK Sarajevo	Radnički Niš	Safet Sušić (FK Sarajevo); Dragoljub Kostić (Napredak Kruševac)	17
1980–81	Red Star	Hajduk Split	Radnički Niš	Milan Radović (NK Rijeka)	26
1981–82	Dinamo Zagreb	Red Star	Hajduk Split	Snješko Cerin (Dinamo Zagreb)	19
1982–83	Partizan	Hajduk Split	Dinamo Zagreb	Sulejman Halilović (Dinamo Vinkovci)	18
1983–84	Red Star	Partizan	Željezničar	Darko Pančev (Vardar Skopje)	19
1984–85	FK Sarajevo	Hajduk Split	Partizan	Zlatko Vujović (Hajduk Split)	25
1985–86	Partizan	Red Star	Velež Mostar	Davor Čop (Dinamo Vinkovci)	20
1986–87	Partizan	Velež Mostar	Red Star	Radmilo Mihajlović (Željezničar)	23
1987–88	Red Star	Partizan	Velež Mostar	Duško Milinković (Rad Belgrade)	16
1988–89	Vojvodina	Red Star	Hajduk Split	Davor Šuker (NK Osijek)	18
1989–90	Red Star	Dinamo Zagreb	Hajduk Split	Darko Pančev (Red Star)	25
1990–91	Red Star	Dinamo Zagreb	Partizan	Darko Pančev (Red Star)	34
1991–92	Red Star	Partizan	Vojvodina	Darko Pančev (Red Star)	25

A special format tournament was held to re-affirm the newly found Yugoslav unity. The tournament consisted of eight teams; Serbia, Croatia, Macedonia, Vojvodina, Slovenia, Montenegro, Bosnia and Herzegovina, and a selection of JNA players.

=== First League of FR Yugoslavia/Serbia and Montenegro ===
The early 1990s became the most unfortunate period. Football had just been experiencing its peak, with Red Star having just been European and World champions in 1991, the league being highly competitive with intense domestic and even foreign media coverage and with crowded stadiums; there was an outburst of numerous talented players, the golden generation that had won the youth world championship in 1987 was reaching its mature age, the national team easily qualified to the 1992 European Championship and was considered among some as favourite after the impressive display in the 1990 FIFA World Cup where ended eliminated in the quarter-finals in a penalty-shoutout against Argentina, and one-by-one all these advantages were turned apart. Those dissatisfied with the regime and the malfunctioning state exploited the game as an explosive tool. Stadiums provided space where footballers and spectators could challenge the status quo of the regime, and served as the backdrop to violent clashes of incompatible nationalist visions.

With the death of Tito a decade earlier, the federation managed to stay united until the democratic elections were introduced, in which many of the politicians opted for forming parties with ethnical platforms, instead of ideological ones. This, along with the rise of nationalism, inevitably led to the break-up of the Yugoslav federation. In football, the Belgrade-based YFA tried to keep it all together as the country was aiming to play in Sweden in the EURO 92, however, one-by-one, initially Slovenia and Croatia, and then Macedonia and Bosnia and Herzegovina, were declaring independence and forming their own Football Associations. Montenegro kept their union with Serbia, and the country was renamed into FR Yugoslavia, however, due to the beginning of the Yugoslav Wars and the involvement of the Federal Army in the conflict, the United Nations imposed economical sanctions to FR Yugoslavia which included the exclusion from all international sporting events, as well.

This led to the replacement in the EURO 92 of Yugoslavia by Denmark, which was second placed in the qualifying group and who will eventually win the tournament. For the national team, this was the start of a period of absence from international stage, which only ended in 1997 when the country was again allowed to participate in international competitions. This meant that an entire generation of players, some of which had become World champions, could not make their contribution to the national team during their most productive years. Similarly at club level, with Serbian teams having made high performances before the sanctions, their reality was completely changed, when in those years under sanctions they only played in domestic league with no practical results as their league qualification would not allow them to compete in continental competitions. This led to an extreme impoverishment of the clubs, with a mass exodus of players abroad. The strongest clubs, which had become a magnet for the best players in the region earlier, were now seeing their talents being obligated to move abroad in order to make an active career. All this created a situation where corruption and profiteering made their great entrance to local football.

Despite all, the domestic league managed to maintain certain level of quality and competitiveness. At the end of the 1990–91 season, clubs from Croatia and Slovenia withdrew and joined their own leagues. The following season the clubs from Bosnia and Macedonia made the same. The clubs from Montenegro stayed in the league system, along with FK Borac Banja Luka, which, because of the Bosnian War, had moved its team to Serbia. The league system was kept similar, although during some seasons a formula of first and second leagues divided each in two groups (A and B each with 10 teams) was introduced.

During this period, Red Star, who lost most of its players from the generation that won the European and Intercontinental Cups, also lost its domestic dominance to their main historic rivals, Partizan. By the mid-1990s the local mafia, who had become increasingly involved in local football, saw their peak when FK Obilić, owned and financed by one of mafia's lords Arkan, started climbing successively in the league system, and won the national championship in 1998. A year later, a new low-point in Serbian football came, when in March 1999 NATO bombing of Yugoslavia began, which interrupted the 1998–99 season which was abandoned and not retaken, as the War lasted for almost 3 months.

At the beginning of the new millennium domestic football started experiencing slowly a revival, with new generations of players being formed inspired by the now veterans which had, despite all, impressive careers. At club level, Partizan reached the UEFA Champions League group stage in 2003–04 season. They managed to have good European performances on several seasons, and had reach the group stages of the UEFA Cup on several occasions. Domestically, this period was marked by the intense rivalry between Partizan and Red Star, the Eternal derby, which became the highlight of Serbian club football.

Clubs were forming quality players, although the main problem was the increasingly shorter period of time the players remained in Serbia. The success of youth national teams gave some hope, however, it also turned the attention of managers towards ever younger players. The importing of talents from the region has been kept active since the Yugoslav period, and by the mid-2000s there has also been an increase of imports from all 5 continents. However, they had been hardly enough to compensate the export of domestic talents which had started in larger scale during the war and sanctions period. Unfortunately, since the stabilization of the political situation, the export of quality players has not diminished as the war period had turned it into a particularly attractive and profitable business for managers and others involved, who simply kept, and even further developed, this lucrative activity.

Season	Champions	Runners up	Third place	Top scorer(s)	Goals
1992–93	Partizan	Red Star	Vojvodina	(Montenegro) Anto Drobnjak (Red Star) (Serbia) Vesko Mihajlović (Vojvodina)	22
1993–94	Partizan	Red Star	Vojvodina	(Serbia) Savo Milošević (Partizan)	21
1994–95	Red Star	Partizan	Vojvodina	(Serbia) Savo Milošević (Partizan)	30
1995–96	Partizan	Red Star	Vojvodina	(Serbia) Vojislav Budimirović (Čukarički)	23
1996–97	Partizan	Red Star	Vojvodina	(Serbia) Zoran Jovičić (Red Star)	21
1997–98	Obilić	Red Star	Partizan	(Serbia) Saša Marković (FK Železnik / Red Star)	27
1998–99	Partizan	Obilić	Red Star	(Serbia) Dejan Osmanović (Hajduk Kula)	16
1999–2000	Red Star	Partizan	Obilić	(Serbia) Mateja Kežman (Partizan)	27
2000–01	Red Star	Partizan	Obilić	(Serbia) Petar Divić (OFK Beograd)	27
2001–02	Partizan	Red Star	Sartid	(Serbia) Zoran Đurašković (Mladost Lučani)	27
2002–03	Partizan	Red Star	OFK Beograd	(Serbia) Zvonimir Vukić (Partizan)	22
2003–04	Red Star	Partizan	Železnik	(Serbia) Nikola Žigić (Red Star)	19
2004–05	Partizan	Red Star	Zeta	(Serbia) Marko Pantelić (Red Star)	21
2005–06	Red Star	Partizan	Voždovac	(Montenegro) Srđan Radonjić (Partizan)	20

=== Serbian SuperLiga ===
Season	Champions	Runners up	Third place	Top scorer(s)	Goals
2006–07	Red Star	Partizan	Vojvodina	(Serbia) Srđan Baljak (Banat)	18
2007–08	Partizan	Red Star	Vojvodina	(Serbia) Nenad Jestrović (Red Star)	13
2008–09	Partizan	Vojvodina	Red Star	(Senegal) Lamine Diarra (Partizan)	19
2009–10	Partizan	Red Star	OFK Beograd	(Serbia) Dragan Mrđa (Vojvodina)	22
2010–11	Partizan	Red Star	Vojvodina	(Serbia) Ivica Iliev (Partizan) (Serbia) Andrija Kaluđerović (Red Star)	13
2011–12	Partizan	Red Star	Vojvodina	(Serbia) Darko Spalević (Radnički 1923)	19
2012–13	Partizan	Red Star	Vojvodina	(Serbia) Miloš Stojanović (Jagodina)	19
2013–14	Red Star	Partizan	Jagodina	(Serbia) Dragan Mrđa (Red Star)	19
2014–15	Partizan	Red Star	Čukarički	(Nigeria) Patrick Friday Eze (Mladost Lučani)	15
2015–16	Red Star	Partizan	Čukarički	(Serbia) Aleksandar Katai (Red Star)	21
2016–17	Partizan	Red Star	Vojvodina	(Serbia) Uroš Đurđević (Partizan) (Brazil) Leonardo (Partizan)	24
2017–18	Red Star	Partizan	Radnički	(Serbia) Aleksandar Pešić (Red Star)	25
2018–19	Red Star	Radnički	Partizan	(Bosnia and Herzegovina) Nermin Haskić (Radnički)	25
2019–20	Red Star	Partizan	Vojvodina	(Serbia) Vladimir Silađi (TSC) (Serbia) Nenad Lukić (TSC) (Serbia) Nikola Petković (Javor)	16
2020–21	Red Star	Partizan	Čukarički	(Serbia) Milan Makarić (Radnik Surdulica)	25
2021–22	Red Star	Partizan	Čukarički	(Cape Verde) Ricardo Gomes (Partizan)	29
2022–23	Red Star	TSC	Čukarički	(Cape Verde) Ricardo Gomes (Partizan)	19
2023–24	Red Star	Partizan	TSC	(Brazil) Matheus Saldanha (Partizan) (Serbia) Miloš Luković (IMT)	17
2024–25	Red Star	Partizan	Novi Pazar	(Senegal) Cherif Ndiaye (Red Star)	19
2025–26	Red Star	Vojvodina	Partizan	(Serbia) Aleksandar Katai (Red Star)	24

== Total titles won ==
These lists include the number of national titles, excluding the Serbian championships played prior to 1923 (which were not national), and the ones played during WWII (which were not FIFA recognised).

All clubs are included with all national titles:

#	Club	Titles	Seasons
1	**Red Star**	37	1946, 1951, 1952–53, 1955–56, 1956–57, 1958–59, 1959–60, 1963–64, 1967–68, 1968–69, 1969–70, 1972–73, 1976–77, 1979–80, 1980–81, 1983–84, 1987–88, 1989–90, 1990–91, 1991–92, 1994–95, 1999–2000, 2000–01, 2003–04, 2005–06, 2006–07, 2013–14, 2015–16, 2017–18, 2018–19, 2019–20, 2020–21, 2021–22, 2022–23, 2023–24, 2024–25, 2025–26
2	**Partizan**	27	1946–47, 1948–49, 1960–61, 1961–62, 1962–63, 1964–65, 1975–76, 1977–78, 1982–83, 1985–86, 1986–87, 1992–93, 1993–94, 1995–96, 1996–97, 1998–99, 2001–02, 2002–03, 2004–05, 2007–08, 2008–09, 2009–10, 2010–11, 2011–12, 2012–13, 2014–15, 2016–17
3	(Croatia) Hajduk Split	9	1927, 1929, 1950, 1952, 1954–55, 1970–71, 1973–74, 1974–75, 1978–79
4	**BSK Beograd**	5	1930–31, 1932–33, 1934–35, 1935–36, 1938–39
4	(Croatia) Građanski Zagreb	5	1923, 1926, 1928, 1936–37, 1939–40
5	(Croatia) Dinamo Zagreb	4	1947–48, 1953–54, 1957–58, 1981–82
6	**Jugoslavija Beograd**	2	1924, 1925
6	(Croatia) Concordia Zagreb	2	1930, 1931–32
6	(Bosnia and Herzegovina) FK Sarajevo	2	1966–67, 1984–85
6	**Vojvodina**	2	1965–66, 1988–89
7	(Croatia) HAŠK Zagreb	1	1937–38
7	(Bosnia and Herzegovina) Željezničar	1	1971–72
7	**Obilić Beograd**	1	1997–98

Note: Teams in bold are teams from Serbia, flags indicate a club based outside Serbia, namely Croatia and Bosnia and Herzegovina. These teams are no longer eligible for the championship as they play in their own leagues.

Total, but including only clubs from present day Serbia

Club	Winners	Runners-up	Winning seasons
Red Star	37	24	1946, 1951, 1952–53, 1955–56, 1956–57, 1958–59, 1959–60, 1963–64, 1967–68, 1968–69, 1969–70, 1972–73, 1976–77, 1979–80, 1980–81, 1983–84, 1987–88, 1989–90, 1990–91, 1991–92, 1994–95, 1999–2000, 2000–01, 2003–04, 2005–06, 2006–07, 2013–14, 2015–16, 2017–18, 2018–19, 2019–20, 2020–21, 2021–22, 2022–23, 2023–24, 2024–25, 2025–26
Partizan	27	23	1946–47, 1948–49, 1960–61, 1961–62, 1962–63, 1964–65, 1975–76, 1977–78, 1982–83, 1985–86, 1986–87, 1992–93, 1993–94, 1995–96, 1996–97, 1998–99, 2001–02, 2002–03, 2004–05, 2007–08, 2008–09, 2009–10, 2010–11, 2011–12, 2012–13, 2014–15, 2016–17
BSK Beograd	5	6	1930–31, 1932–33, 1934–35, 1935–36, 1938–39
Vojvodina	2	5	1965–66, 1988–89
Jugoslavija	2	3	1924, 1925
Obilić	1	1	1997–98

Total including the period from 1992 on, after the breakup of SFR Yugoslavia

Club	Winners	Runners-up	Winning seasons
Red Star	17	15	1994–95, 1999–2000, 2000–01, 2003–04, 2005–06, 2006–07, 2013–14, 2015–16, 2017–18, 2018–19, 2019–20, 2020–21, 2021–22, 2022–23, 2023–24, 2024–25, 2025–26
Partizan	16	14	1992–93, 1993–94, 1995–96, 1996–97, 1998–99, 2001–02, 2002–03, 2004–05, 2007–08, 2008–09, 2009–10, 2010–11, 2011–12, 2012–13, 2014–15, 2016–17
Obilić	1	1	1997–98
Vojvodina	0	2	
Radnički Niš	0	1	
TSC	0	1	

Total, including only from 2006 on

Club	Winners	Runners-up	Winning seasons
Red Star	12	7	2006–07, 2013–14, 2015–16, 2017–18, 2018–19, 2019–20, 2020–21, 2021–22, 2022–23, 2023–24, 2024–25, 2025–26
Partizan	8	9	2007–08, 2008–09, 2009–10, 2010–11, 2011–12, 2012–13, 2014–15, 2016–17
Vojvodina	0	2	
Radnički Niš	0	1	
TSC	0	1	

== See also ==
- Football in Serbia
- Eternal derby (Serbia)
