= Serbian SuperLiga =

Serbian association football league

Serbian Super League
- Founded: 2006; 20 years ago
- Country: Serbia
- Confederation: UEFA
- Number of clubs: 14 (12 from 2027–28)
- Level on pyramid: 1
- Relegation to: Serbian First League
- Domestic cup: Serbian Cup
- International cup(s): UEFA Champions League; UEFA Europa League; UEFA Conference League
- Current champions: Red Star Belgrade (12th title) (2025–26)
- Most championships: Red Star Belgrade (12 titles)
- Most appearances: Janko Tumbasević (448 matches)
- Top scorer: Aleksandar Katai (130 goals)
- Broadcasters: Arena Sport, Adria TV, SportKlub Slovenia, Match TV
- Website: superliga.rs
- Current: 2026–27 Serbian SuperLiga

The Serbian Super League (Serbian: Супер лига Србије / Super liga Srbije), also known as Mozzart Bet Super League for sponsorship reasons, is a professional association football league in Serbia and the highest level of the Serbian football league system. It is currently contested by 14 clubs, but from 2027–28, the number of teams will reduce from 14 to 12. It operates on a system of promotion and relegation with the Serbian First League.

The SuperLiga was formed during the summer of 2005 as the country's top football league competition in Serbia and Montenegro. Since summer 2006 after the secession of Montenegro from Serbia, the league only has had Serbian clubs.

Serbian clubs used to compete in the Yugoslav First League. This competition was formed in 1923 and lasted until 2003. After the downfall of SFR Yugoslavia in 1991 a new Yugoslavia would be formed that would be named FR Yugoslavia with Montenegro and Serbia. They kept the name Yugoslavia until 2003 when the country changed its name to Serbia and Montenegro: this union lasted until 2006 when Montenegro gained independence and formed its own league, the Montenegrin First League.

The current SuperLiga champions are Red Star Belgrade. UEFA currently ranks the league 13th in Europe of 55 leagues.

== Format ==
=== Competition ===
The SuperLiga began as a league with a playoff system in an attempt to boost ratings and improve competition. After the first season however, the SuperLiga changed its format. The 2007–08 season was the first to be played in a more traditional format. The league no longer divided into a play-off and play-out group midway through the campaign. Instead, the 12 teams began playing each other three times in a more conventional league format. After two seasons with that format the Football Association of Serbia decided to add 4 teams to the SuperLiga. The 2009–10 season will be the first with a 16 team league played in a conventional league format of one home and one away match rather than the previous 3 match encounters. This drops the match schedule from 33 rounds to 30.

As of the 2015-16 season, the league reverted to its previous playoff system, whereby the top 8 placed teams compete in the championship round at the end of the season and the 8 lowest placed teams play in the relegation playoff round. The two bottom placed teams are relegated to the second division, the Serbian Prva Liga. The third lowest-placed team is then sent to a relegation playoff against the third-placed team in the second division. Whichever team wins will play in the SuperLiga the following season.

SuperLiga will reduce from 16 to 14 in 2026–27 and 12 in 2027–28, four teams relegated from top tier, while two teams from First League will automatically promoted.

=== Qualification for UEFA competitions ===
Superliga champions and runner-ups enter Champions League qualifying entering the play-off round and second qualifying round respectively. The cup winner qualifies for the Europa League playoff round. The third and fourth placed teams enter the qualyfing round of the UEFA Europa Conference League, entering in the third and second qualifying round respectively.

In 2022-23, champions Red Star Belgrade were guaranteed to enter the Champions League group stage, due to access list changes in the Champions League regarding the suspension of Russian teams, and Serbia was ranked 11th in the UEFA coefficient list. TSC was also promoted from the UCL second qualifying round to the third qualifying round. This meant that for the first time ever, Serbia was allocated a group stage berth in the Champions League.

== History ==
The Yugoslav First League started being played in 1923, and gathered the best clubs from the former Yugoslavia. In 1991, clubs from Slovenia and Croatia left and formed their own league systems, and in 1992 so did the clubs from Bosnia and Herzegovina and Macedonia. The Yugoslav First League was played since 1992 with clubs from Serbia and Montenegro, until 2006, when Montenegro declared independence and subsequently formed its own league system. Since 2006 the league is formed exclusively by clubs from Serbia and got renamed into Serbian SuperLiga.

=== Kingdom of Yugoslavia League (1923–1940) ===
Club	Titles	Years won	Runners up
BSK	5	1931, 1933, 1935, 1936, 1939	4
Jugoslavija	2	1924, 1925	3

=== Socialist Republic of Serbia League (1946) ===
Club	Titles	Years won
Red Star	1	1946

=== Yugoslav First League (1946–1992) ===
Club	Titles	Years won	Runners up	Third place
Red Star	19	1951, 1953, 1956, 1957, 1959, 1960, 1964, 1968, 1969, 1970, 1973, 1977, 1980, 1981, 1984, 1988, 1990, 1991, 1992	9	7
Partizan	11	1947, 1949, 1961, 1962, 1963, 1965, 1976, 1978, 1983, 1986, 1987	9	8
Vojvodina	2	1966, 1989	3	2
OFK Beograd			2	2
Radnički Beograd				2
Radnički Niš				2

=== First League of Federal Republic Yugoslavia/Serbia and Montenegro (1992–2006) ===
In 1992 the Yugoslav First League became the First League of FR Yugoslavia (Prva savezna liga or Meridian SuperLiga) and was played since then with the clubs from Serbia and Montenegro.

The league winner had access to the UEFA Champions League qualifications rounds, and the 2nd, 3rd and the Cup winner had played in the UEFA Cup. The bottom clubs would be relegated to the two Second Leagues depending on the republic they were based in, the Second League of Serbia (Druga savezna liga Srbija) and the Second League of Montenegro (Druga savezna liga grupa Crna Gora).

In 2002, FR Yugoslavia changed its name to Serbia and Montenegro, and the league was named First League of Serbia and Montenegro between 2002 and its dissolution, in 2006. In 2006 Serbia and Montenegro separated and formed their own top leagues (Serbian SuperLiga and Montenegrin First League). Serbian SuperLiga was officially declared the successor of the First Leagues of FR Yugoslavia and Serbia and Montenegro.

A total of 41 clubs participated between 1992 and 2006, being 34 from Serbia, 6 from Montenegro and one from Bosnia and Herzegovina (Borac Banja Luka was temporarily based in Serbia in early 1990s). A total of 3 clubs were champions, all from Serbia, Partizan (8 times), Red Star (5 times) and Obilić (once).

Season	Champions	Runners-up	Third place	Top scorer(s)	Goals
1992–93	Partizan (12)	Red Star	Vojvodina	Anto Drobnjak (Red Star); Vesko Mihajlović (Vojvodina)	22
1993–94	Partizan (13)	Red Star	Vojvodina	Savo Milošević (Partizan)	21
1994–95	Red Star (21)	Partizan	Vojvodina	Savo Milošević (Partizan)	30
1995–96	Partizan (14)	Red Star	Vojvodina	Vojislav Budimirović (Čukarički)	23
1996–97	Partizan (15)	Red Star	Vojvodina	Zoran Jovičić (Red Star)	21
1997–98	Obilić (1)	Red Star	Partizan	Saša Marković (Železnik / Red Star)	27
1998–99	Partizan (16)	Obilić	Red Star	Dejan Osmanović (Hajduk Kula)	16
1999–00	Red Star (22)	Partizan	Obilić	Mateja Kežman (Partizan)	27
2000–01	Red Star (23)	Partizan	Obilić	Petar Divić (OFK Beograd)	27
2001–02	Partizan (17)	Red Star	Sartid	Zoran Đurašković (Mladost Lučani)	27
2002–03	Partizan (18)	Red Star	OFK Belgrade	Zvonimir Vukić (Partizan)	22
2003–04	Red Star (24)	Partizan	Železnik	Nikola Žigić (Red Star)	19
2004–05	Partizan (19)	Red Star	Zeta	Marko Pantelić (Red Star)	21
2005–06	Red Star (25)	Partizan	Voždovac	Srđan Radonjić (Partizan)	20

Club	Titles	Years won	Runners up	Third place
Partizan	8	1993, 1994, 1996, 1997, 1999, 2002, 2003, 2005	5	1
Red Star	5	1995, 2000, 2001, 2004, 2006	8	1
Obilić	1	1998	1	2
Vojvodina				5
Sartid				1
OFK Beograd				1
Železnik				1
Voždovac				1

=== Serbian Superliga (2006–) ===
A total of 39 clubs participated between 2006 and 2023 in the Serbian Superliga. After 18 seasons, Red Star has won 10 championship titles and Partizan has won 8 championship title. Also, Red Star is record holder by winning 7 consecutive champion titles.

Season	Champions	Runners up	Third place	Top scorer(s)	Goals
2006–07	Red Star (26)	Partizan	Vojvodina	(Serbia) Srđan Baljak (Banat)	18
2007–08	Partizan (20)	Red Star	Vojvodina	(Serbia) Nenad Jestrović (Red Star)	13
2008–09	Partizan (21)	Vojvodina	Red Star	(Senegal) Lamine Diarra (Partizan)	19
2009–10	Partizan (22)	Red Star	OFK	(Serbia) Dragan Mrđa (Vojvodina)	22
2010–11	Partizan (23)	Red Star	Vojvodina	(Serbia) Ivica Iliev (Partizan) (Serbia) Andrija Kaluđerović (Red Star)	13
2011–12	Partizan (24)	Red Star	Vojvodina	(Serbia) Darko Spalević (Radnički Kragujevac)	19
2012–13	Partizan (25)	Red Star	Vojvodina	(Serbia) Miloš Stojanović (Jagodina)	19
2013–14	Red Star (27)	Partizan	Jagodina	(Serbia) Dragan Mrđa (2) (Red Star)	19
2014–15	Partizan (26)	Red Star	Čukarički	(Nigeria) Patrick Friday Eze (Mladost Lučani)	15
2015–16	Red Star (28)	Partizan	Čukarički	(Serbia) Aleksandar Katai (Red Star)	21
2016–17	Partizan (27)	Red Star	Vojvodina	(Serbia) Uroš Đurđević (Partizan) (Brazil) Leonardo (Partizan)	24
2017–18	Red Star (29)	Partizan	Radnički Niš	(Serbia) Aleksandar Pešić (Red Star)	25
2018–19	Red Star (30)	Radnički Niš	Partizan	(Bosnia and Herzegovina) Nermin Haskić (Radnički Niš)	24
2019–20	Red Star (31)	Partizan	Vojvodina	(Serbia) Vladimir Silađi (TSC) (Serbia) Nenad Lukić (TSC) (Serbia) Nikola Petković (Javor)	16
2020–21	Red Star (32)	Partizan	Čukarički	(Serbia) Milan Makarić (Radnik)	25
2021–22	Red Star (33)	Partizan	Čukarički	(Cape Verde) Ricardo Gomes (Partizan)	29
2022–23	Red Star (34)	TSC	Čukarički	(Cape Verde) Ricardo Gomes (2) (Partizan)	19
2023–24	Red Star (35)	Partizan	TSC	(Brazil) Matheus Saldanha (Partizan) (Serbia) Miloš Luković (IMT)	17
2024–25	Red Star (36)	Partizan	Novi Pazar	(Senegal) Cherif Ndiaye (Red Star)	18
2025–26	Red Star (37)	Vojvodina	Partizan	(Serbia) Aleksandar Katai (2) (Red Star)	24
2026–27					

Club	Titles	Years won	Runners up	Third place
Red Star	12	2007, 2014, 2016, 2018, 2019, 2020, 2021, 2022, 2023, 2024, 2025, 2026	7	1
Partizan	8	2008, 2009, 2010, 2011, 2012, 2013, 2015, 2017	9	2
Vojvodina			2	7
Radnički Niš			1	1
TSC			1	1
Čukarički				5
Jagodina				1
OFK Beograd				1
Novi Pazar				1

== Serbian all-time champions (1923–present) ==
Club	Titles	Years won	Runners up
Red Star	37	1946, 1951, 1953, 1956, 1957, 1959, 1960, 1964, 1968, 1969, 1970, 1973, 1977, 1980, 1981, 1984, 1988, 1990, 1991, 1992, 1995, 2000, 2001, 2004, 2006, 2007, 2014, 2016, 2018, 2019, 2020, 2021, 2022, 2023, 2024, 2025, 2026	24
Partizan	27	1947, 1949, 1961, 1962, 1963, 1965, 1976, 1978, 1983, 1986, 1987, 1993, 1994, 1996, 1997, 1999, 2002, 2003, 2005, 2008, 2009, 2010, 2011, 2012, 2013, 2015, 2017	22
OFK Beograd	5	1931, 1933, 1935, 1936, 1939	6
Vojvodina	2	1966, 1989	5
Jugoslavija	2	1924, 1925	3
Obilić	1	1998	1

== All-time table 2006–2026 ==
The following is a list of clubs who have played in the Serbian SuperLiga at any time since its formation in 2006 to the current season. Teams playing in the 2026–27 Serbian SuperLiga are indicated in bold. A total of 41 teams have played in the Serbian SuperLiga. The table is accurate as of the start of the 2026–27 season.

Pos.	Team	Town	S	P	W	D	L	F	A	Pts	1º	2º	3º	1st App	Since/Last App	Highest finish
**1**	**Red Star**	Belgrade	**20**	**679**	**526**	93	60	**1581**	485	**1671**	**12**	7	1	2006–07	2006–07	1st
**2**	**Partizan**	Belgrade	**20**	**679**	470	115	94	1401	526	1525	8	**9**	2	2006–07	2006–07	1st
**3**	**Vojvodina**	Novi Sad	**20**	**679**	328	**168**	183	980	690	1152	–	2	**7**	2006–07	2006–07	2nd
**4**	**Čukarički**	Belgrade	17	587	237	153	197	774	689	864	–	–	5	2007–08	2013–14	3rd
5	Spartak	Subotica	17	581	195	149	237	660	**769**	734	–	–	–	2009–10	2025–26	4th
**6**	**Radnički**	Niš	14	491	188	128	175	605	599	692	–	1	1	2012–13	2012–13	2nd
**7**	**Mladost**	Lučani	13	464	160	125	179	515	626	605	–	–	–	2007–08	2014–15	4th
8	Napredak	Kruševac	15	520	156	123	**241**	531	703	591	–	–	–	2007–08	2025–26	5th
9	Javor	Ivanjica	14	473	136	141	196	467	596	549	–	–	–	2008–09	2025–26	4th
10	Voždovac	Belgrade	12	419	145	96	178	467	549	531	–	–	–	2006–07	2023–24	5th
**11**	**Novi Pazar**	Novi Pazar	12	417	136	98	183	458	590	506	–	–	1	2011–12	2020–21	3rd
**12**	**OFK Beograd**	Belgrade	12	389	139	85	165	447	500	502	–	–	1	2006–07	2024–25	3rd
13	Rad	Belgrade	13	429	129	105	195	418	551	492	–	–	–	2008–09	2020–21	4th
14	TSC	Bačka Topola	7	253	117	59	77	423	314	410	–	1	1	2019–20	2025–26	2nd
**15**	**Radnik**	Surdulica	10	364	104	98	162	378	511	410	–	–	–	2015–16	2025–26	6th
**16**	**Radnički 1923**	Kragujevac	9	305	92	89	124	346	412	365	–	–	–	2011–12	2021–22	5th
17	Borac	Čačak	10	329	89	89	151	277	408	356	–	–	–	2006–07	2017–18	4th
18	Jagodina	Jagodina	8	250	87	60	103	268	296	321	–	–	1	2008–09	2015–16	3rd
19	Hajduk	Kula	7	218	64	59	95	194	248	251	–	–	–	2006–07	2012–13	5th
20	Metalac	Gornji Milanovac	7	239	59	66	114	217	334	243	–	–	–	2009–10	2021–22	9th
21	Smederevo	Smederevo	6	185	50	42	93	153	240	192	–	–	–	2006–07	2012–13	8th
22	Sloboda	Užice	4	120	45	32	43	136	145	167	–	–	–	2010–11	2013–14	5th
23	Proleter	Novi Sad	4	142	40	36	66	129	187	156	–	–	–	2018–19	2021–22	8th
**24**	**Železničar**	Pančevo	3	111	39	30	42	146	145	147	–	–	–	2023–24	2023–24	4th
**25**	**IMT**	Belgrade	3	111	37	29	45	133	159	140	–	–	–	2023–24	2023–24	9th
26	BSK Borča	Belgrade	4	120	32	30	58	94	170	126	–	–	–	2009–10	2012–13	11th
27	OFK Bačka	Bačka Palanka	4	149	32	26	91	123	246	122	–	–	–	2016–17	2020–21	13th
**28**	**Mačva**	Šabac	4	142	30	30	82	106	224	120	–	–	–	2017–18	2026–27	12th
29	Banat	Zrenjanin	3	98	25	26	47	91	141	101	–	–	–	2006–07	2008–09	9th
30	Donji Srem	Pećinci	3	90	22	26	42	80	116	92	–	–	–	2012–13	2014–15	11th
31	Inđija	Inđija	3	98	24	14	60	84	161	86	–	–	–	2010–11	2020–21	14th
32	Kolubara	Lazarevac	2	74	25	12	37	70	122	81	–	–	–	2021–22	2022–23	10th
**33**	**Zemun**	Belgrade	3	106	18	26	62	97	163	80	–	–	–	2006–07	2026–27	11th
34	Bežanija	Belgrade	2	65	17	16	32	67	89	67	–	–	–	2006–07	2007–08	4th
35	Mladost	Apatin	1	32	11	8	13	25	33	41	–	–	–	2006–07	2006–07	6th
36	Dinamo	Vranje	1	37	9	6	22	24	67	33	–	–	–	2018–19	2018–19	14th
37	Tekstilac	Odžaci	1	37	11	4	22	33	65	31	–	–	–	2024–25	2024–25	15th
38	Mladost	Novi Sad	1	37	6	12	19	25	49	30	–	–	–	2022–23	2022–23	16th
39	Zlatibor	Čajetina	1	38	7	8	23	28	64	29	–	–	–	2020–21	2020–21	18th
40	Mladi Radnik	Požarevac	1	30	5	10	15	19	47	25	–	–	–	2009–10	2009–10	16th
41	Jedinstvo	Ub	1	37	7	4	26	32	73	25	–	–	–	2024–25	2024–25	16th

League or status at 2026–27:

2026–27 Serbian SuperLiga
2026–27 Serbian First League
2026–27 Serbian League
2026–27 fourth or lower degree of competition
Dissolved

== Current clubs ==
Locations of the 2026–27 Serbian SuperLiga teams
1 Red Star
2 Čukarički
3 IMT
4 Mačva
5 Mladost
6 Novi Pazar
7 OFK Beograd
8 Partizan
9 Radnički 1923
10 Radnički Niš
11 Radnik Surdulica
12 Zemun
13 Vojvodina
14 Železničar

The following 14 clubs compete in the Mozzart Bet SuperLiga during the 2026–27 season.

Club	Finishing position in 2025–26	First season in top division	First season after most recent promotion	Stadium	Official website
Red Star	1st	1946	1946	Rajko Mitić Stadium	crvenazvezdafk.com
Čukarički	8th	1995–96	2013–14	Čukarički Stadium	fkcukaricki.co.rs
IMT	9th	2023–24	2023–24	Lagator Stadium, Loznica (temporarily)	fkimt.com
Mačva	2nd in Serbian First League	1931	2026–27	FK Mačva Stadium	fkmacva.com
Mladost	11th	1995–96	2014–15	SRC MR Radoš Milovanović	fkmladostlucani.com
Novi Pazar	5th	2011–12	2020–21	Novi Pazar City Stadium	fknovipazar.com
OFK Beograd	6th	1927	2024–25	Omladinski Stadium	ofkbeograd.com
Partizan	3rd	1946–47	1946–47	Partizan Stadium	partizan.rs
Radnički 1923	12th	1935–36	2021–22	Čika Dača Stadium	fkradnicki.com
Radnički Niš	10th	1935–36	2012–13	Čair Stadium	fkradnickinis.rs
Radnik Surdulica	7th	2015–16	2025–26	Surdulica City Stadium	fk-radnik.com
Zemun	1st in Serbian First League	1982–83	2026–27	Zemun Stadium	fkzemun.com
Vojvodina	2nd	1932	1987–88	Karađorđe Stadium	fkvojvodina.rs
Železničar	4th	2023–24	2023–24	SC Mladost Stadium	fkzeleznicar.rs

== Stadiums ==
Serbian top-level football has been played in 27 stadiums since its formation in 2006. The top-three stadiums by clubs who are competing currently in the Serbian top flight by seating capacity are Belgrade-based Rajko Mitić Stadium, Partizan Stadium and FK Radnicki Niš Čair Stadium.

Below are the ten largest stadiums in Serbia of clubs who are competing or have competed in the Serbian top division of football. Currently in the below list seven of these clubs are competing in the Serbian top flight, them been as follows : Red Star, Partizan, OFK, Vojvodina, Radnički Niš, Radnički 1923 and Spartak Subotica.

Biggest stadiums by seating capacity
Stadium		Club	City	Opened	Capacity
1	Rajko Mitić Stadium	Red Star	Belgrade	1963	51,755
2	Partizan Stadium	Partizan	Belgrade	1951	29,775
3	Čair Stadium	Radnički	Niš	1963	18,151
4	Smederevo Stadium	Smederevo 1924	Smederevo	1930	17,200
5	Čika Dača Stadium	Radnički 1923	Kragujevac	1957	15,100
6	Karađorđe Stadium	FK Vojvodina	Novi Sad	1924	14,458
7	Stadion Karađorđev park	Banat	Zrenjanin	1968	13,500
8	Subotica City Stadium	Spartak	Subotica	1936	13,000
9	Radomir Antić Stadium	FK Sloboda Užice	Užice	1958	12,000
10	Omladinski Stadium	OFK Beograd	Belgrade	1957	10,600

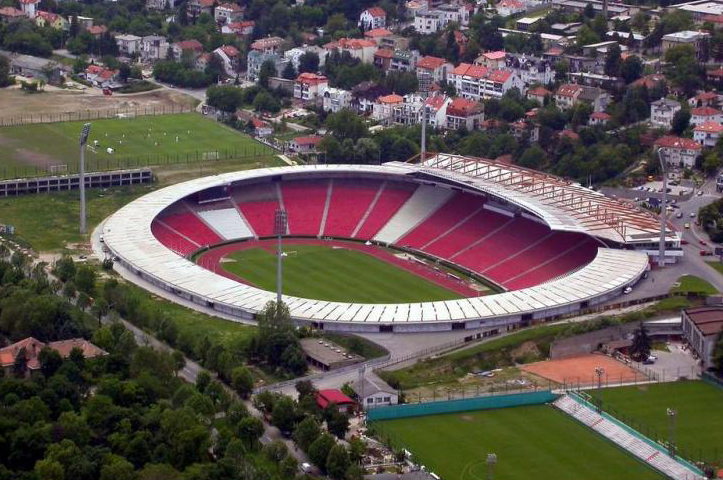
Rajko Mitić Stadium

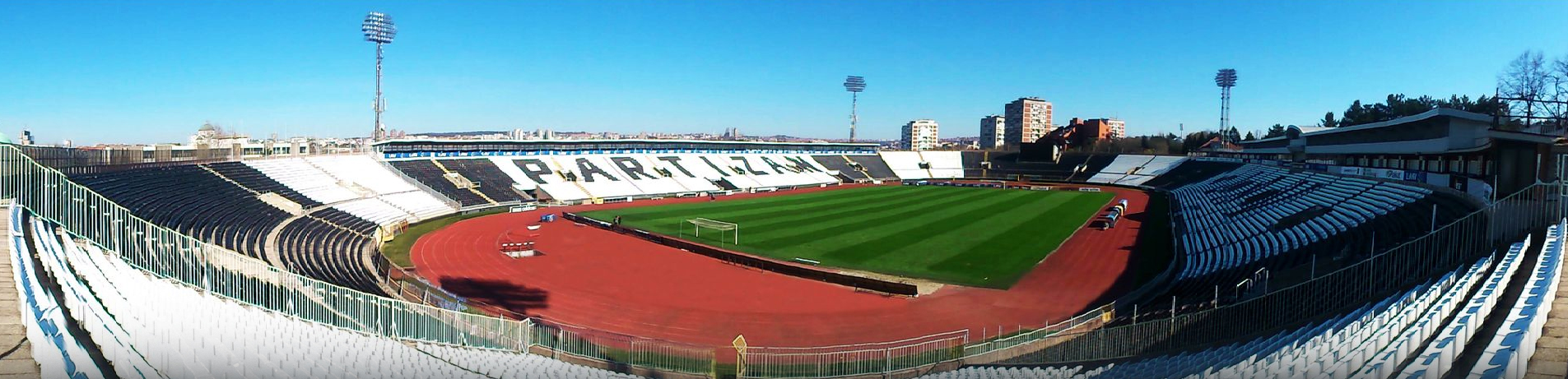
Partizan Stadium

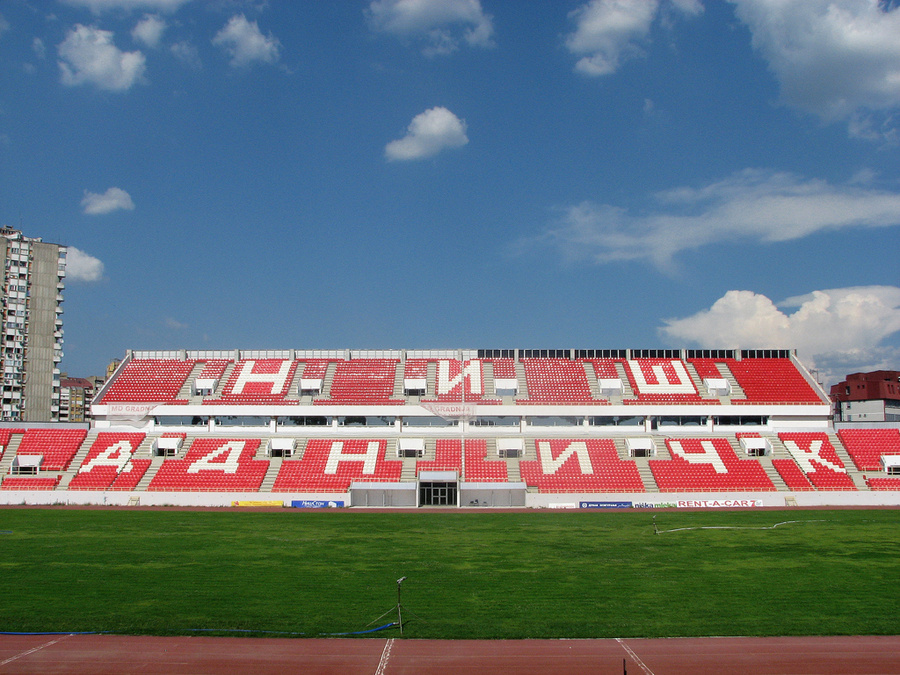
Čair Stadium

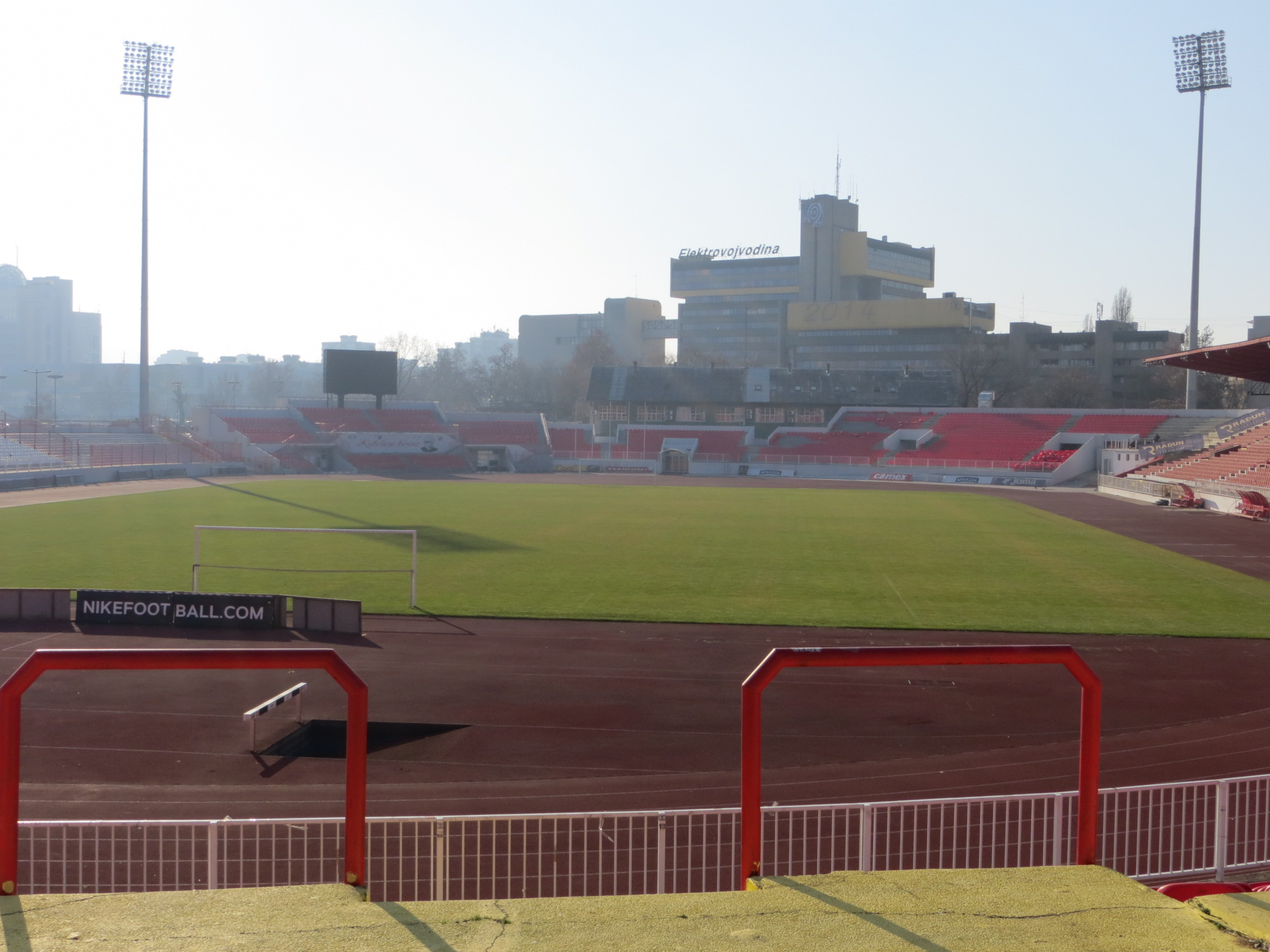
Karađorđe Stadium

== Superliga records and statistics ==
Attendance

- Highest single game attendance: 48,347, Red Star vs. OFK Beograd during 2013–14 season
- Highest average home attendance: 19,819 (15 home games), Red Star during 2011–12 season

Single game

- Biggest home win: 7–0, Vojvodina vs. Napredak during 2009–10, Partizan vs. BSK Borča during 2012–13 season, Čukarički vs. Rad during 2014–15 season, Zemun vs. Bačka during 2018–19 season and TSC vs. Novi Pazar during 2020–21 season
- Biggest away win: 0–7, Radnički Niš beats Javor during 2019–20 season
- Most goals in a single game: 9, Čukarički 2–7 Red Star during 2015–16 season; FK TSC 6–3 FK Železničar Pančevo during 2023–24 season
- Highest draw: Čukarički 4–4 Vojvodina during 2008–09 season, TSC 4–4 Radnički 1923 during 2021–22 season
- Fastest turnover: Red Star scoring 2 goals in 61 seconds. Metalac 1-2 Red Star during 2016–17 season

Players

- Most league appearances: 356, Janko Tumbasević in 15 seasons between 2007–08 and 2022–23
- Most league goals: 130, Aleksandar Katai He's currently working for Red Star Belgrade, He also played for the team Vojvodina.
- Most league goals in a season: 29, Ricardo Gomes for Partizan during 2021–22 season
- Youngest player used: 16 years, 0 months and 7 days, Luka Belić for OFK Beograd vs. Red Star on 25 April 2012
- Oldest player used: 41 years, 4 months and 19 days, Saša Ilić for FK Partizan vs. FK Proleter on 19 May 2019
- Fastest hat-trick: 9 min, Dragan Mrđa for Red Star vs. Spartak on 29 September 2013
- Most league goals in one game: 5, Petar Jelić playing for Rad vs. Voždovac on 23 August 2014. and Saša Marjanović playing for Radnički Niš vs. Radnik Surdulica on 28 April 2016
- Fastest goal: 10.5 seconds, Uroš Đurđević playing for Partizan vs. Čukarički on 11 December 2016.
- Most hat-tricks in SuperLiga: 6, Dragan Mrđa playing for Vojvodina and Red Star
- Longest scoring run in SuperLiga: – Hugo Vieira 15 goals, 10 games playing for Red Star during 2015–16 season.
- Fastest own goal: 52 seconds, Ivan Bandalovski playing for Partizan vs Čukarički during 2015–16 season.

Clubs

- Most consecutive league victories: 24 out of 37 games, Red Star during 2015–16 season
- Most consecutive league defeats: 14, Čukarički during 2010–11 season
- Most consecutive league games without defeat (undefeated run): 65, Red Star from 27 October 2021 to 26 August 2023
- Club having top season scorers: 3, Red Star
- Club with overall SuperLiga hat-tricks: 12, Red Star
- Club with most consecutive league titles is Red Star since 2017–18,9 titles in a row

Season

- Most points won in a single season: 108, Red Star during 2020–21 season
- Fewest points won in a single season: 5, Čukarički during 2010–11 season
- Fewest won games in a single season: 0, Čukarički during 2010–11 season
- Most team goals in a single season: 114, Red Star during 2020–21 season
- Fewest team goals in a single season: 10, Čukarički during 2010–11 season
- Most team goals against in a single season: 65, Čukarički during 2010–11 season
- Fewest team goals against in a single season: 12, Partizan during 2011–12 season
- The best goal difference in a single season: +94, Red Star during 2020–21 season
- The worst goal difference in a single season: –55, Čukarički during 2010–11 season and Mačva Šabac during 2020–21 season
- Most hat-tricks in a season: 3 Dragan Mrđa playing for Vojvodina during 2009–10 season, Nermin Haskić playing for Radnički Niš during 2018–19 season and Aleksandar Katai playing for Red Star during 2021–22 season

Goalkeepers

- Goalscoring goalkeepers (excluding own goals):
  - Darko Božović (Bežanija 1–1 Voždovac, 28 October 2006)
  - Vladimir Stojković (Partizan 7–0 BSK Borča, 11 August 2012)
  - Milan Borjan (Red Star 3–1 Voždovac, 22 May 2022)

== UEFA ranking ==
The following data indicates Serbian coefficient rankings between European football leagues.

- Highest position: 4 (1990–91 season, 8.666 points)
- Lower position: 47 (1996)
View chart definition.

=== Country ===
As of 29 August 2026

Current ranking	Last season ranking	Movement	League	Coefficient
26	26	Steady	(Slovenia) Prva liga Telemach	22.843
27	29	▲2	(Slovakia) Niké liga	22.375
28	30	▲2	(Bulgaria) First Professional Football League	20.562
29	24	▼5	(Serbia) Mozzart Bet SuperLiga	18.250
30	28	▼2	(Russia) Russian Premier League	17.332
31	32	▲1	(Iceland) Besta deild karla	17.020
32	31	▼1	(Republic of Ireland) League of Ireland Premier Division	16.343

=== Team ===
As of 29 August 2026

Rank	Team	Points
62	Red Star	34.000
108	Partizan	17.500
205	TSC	8.125
282	Vojvodina	5.000
310	Čukarički	4.500
333	Železničar Pančevo	3.650
333	Radnički 1923	3.650
333	Novi Pazar	3.650
333	Radnički Niš	3.650

== All time Serbian football clubs in European and World competitions ==
=== UEFA Champions League ===
Club	Champions	Finalist	Semifinalist
Red Star	1991	-	1957, 1971, 1992
Partizan	-	1966	-

=== UEFA Europa League ===
Club	Champions	Finalist	Semifinalist
Red Star	-	1979	-
Radnički Niš	-	-	1982

=== UEFA Cup Winners' Cup ===
Club	Champions	Finalist	Semifinalist
Red Star	-	-	1975
OFK Beograd	-	-	1963

=== Intercontinental Cup ===
Club	Champions	Finalist
Red Star	1991	-

=== UEFA Super Cup ===
Club	Champions	Finalist
Red Star	-	1991

=== UEFA Intertoto Cup ===
Club	Champions	Finalist	Semifinalist
Vojvodina	1976	1998	-
Hajduk Kula	-	2007	-

=== Inter-Cities Fairs Cup ===
Club	Champions	Finalist	Semifinalist
Red Star	-	-	1962

=== Mitropa Cup ===
Club	Champions	Finalist
Red Star	1958, 1968	-
Vojvodina	1977	1957
Partizan	1978	-

=== Balkans Cup ===
Club	Champions	Finalist
Radnički Niš	1975	1989

== The Golden Star ==
Based on an idea of Umberto Agnelli, the honor of Golden Star for Sports Excellence was introduced to recognize sides that have won multiple championships or other honours by the display of gold stars on their team badges and jerseys.

The current officially sanctioned SuperLiga stars indicate a club had won 10 titles per star and are:

- Red Star Belgrade received the first 2 stars in 1995, the 3rd star in 2019
- Partizan Belgrade received 2 stars in 2008

== Names of the competition ==
- 2006–2008: Meridian SuperLiga
- 2008–2015: Jelen SuperLiga
- 2015–2019: Serbian SuperLiga
- 2019–2022: Linglong Tire SuperLiga
- 2022–2028: Mozzart Bet SuperLiga

== Broadcasting rights ==
=== Television ===
Serbian Superliga games are broadcast live on Arena Sport in countries of Ex-Yugoslavia. 02.TV starts broadcasting Serbian Superliga from March 2019. SportKlub Slovenia and Match TV also broadcasting live Serbian Superliga matches.

The Eternal derby is the game that attracts most attention from the foreign media. In 2010, the 139th Eternal derby was broadcast in 19 countries and over 60 foreign correspondents were present.

== Sponsorships ==
- Nike (2006–2014)
- Umbro (2014–present)

== See also ==
- Serbian Cup
- List of football clubs in Serbia
- Serbia national football team
- Yugoslav First League
- First League of Serbia and Montenegro
- Prva Futsal Liga
