= Serbian Cup =

- Organiser(s): Football Association of Serbia
- Founded: 2006; 20 years ago
- Region: Serbia
- Teams: 32 (main draw)
- Qualifier for: UEFA Europa League
- Current champions: Red Star (9th title)
- Most championships: Red Star (9 titles)
- Broadcaster: Arena Sport
- Website: www.fss.rs
- 2026–27 Serbian Cup

The Serbian Cup (Serbian: Куп Србије / Kup Srbije), also known as Mozzart Serbian Cup for sponsorship reasons, is the national football cup of Serbia. The winner of the competition gets a spot in the UEFA Europa League qualifying round.

== History ==
Serbia's cup tournament is the legal successor to the Serbia and Montenegro Cup and in turn of the Yugoslav Cup. This cup tournament lasted for four seasons up until the dissolution of the state union of Serbia and Montenegro in 2006. The tournament was dominated by Serbian clubs with no Montenegrin sides reaching the final. Belgrade giants Red Star were easily the most successful club, reaching the final all four years winning twice and losing in the final the other two seasons. Surprisingly, Red Star's cross-town rival Partizan did not appear in a single final.

After Montenegro left the state union with Serbia in 2006, both football associations got to work on organizing a new tournament.

== Trophy ==
Before the tournament even began it was decided that Serbia's cup would have a new trophy and that the old one which was won by Red Star the year before would remain in its museum. However the association decided that the championship trophy would remain the same. To find a new trophy for the cup they decided to organise a contest at Belgrade's Art College where students would each make one and then a trophy would be selected. The Serbian Football Association officials presented the new trophy of the National Cup competition on Monday December 11, 2006. Artist Mihajlo Mlinar defeated 50 other students in the contest held at Belgrade's Art College. The trophy which is heavily inspired by Eastern Orthodox Christianity as well as Serbian history was proclaimed as the perfect trophy for the biggest football competition in Serbia.

When the press asked Mlinar which club has his support, the 25-year-old answered that he simply never had a day of football training and that his only favorite is Serbia. Everybody present agreed that the student was the perfect candidate for making the trophy, and that he fully deserved the cash prize of 250,000 Serbian Dinars. Mlinar immediately became one of the most recognized faces across Belgrade. On May 15, 2007, at Partizan's stadium Red Star defeated Vojvodina to be the first ever Serbian Cup winner and the first team to lift the trophy that Mlinar created.

== Sponsorship ==
In 2006, Serbian FA agreed the marketing rights with Carlsberg Srbija, previously known as Pivara Čelarevo, and the competition was named after its main brand Lav pivo. The Carlsberg affiliate signed a deal to support the Serbian Cup for four years. The company will take out a sum of €1,000,000 which will be divided in four for every year of competition. That means that the awards annual budget is going to be €250,000. Along with the rewards from endorsements the winner of the Serbian Cup gets a spot in the UEFA Europa League if they are not already qualified through Serbian SuperLiga.

Period	Sponsor	Name
2006–2010	(Serbia) Lav pivo	Lav Cup

== Winners ==
Note: The Serbian Cup has been derived from two defunct cup tournaments the first being the Yugoslav Cup and the other being the Serbia and Montenegro Cup. The 2006–07 season was the first one that Serbia has ever held as an independent football association. For a list of previous Serbian cup winners during those tournaments visit their respective pages.

=== Key ===
Key to list of winners
(R)	Replay
	Two-legged tie
*	Match went to extra time
†	Match decided by a penalty shoot-out after extra time
‡	Winning team won The Double
Italics	Team from outside the top level of Serbian football

=== Result ===
Season	Winner	Score	Runner-up	Location	Venue
2006–07	Red Star ‡	**2–0**	Vojvodina	Belgrade	Partizan Stadium
2007–08	Partizan ‡	**3–0**	Zemun	Belgrade	Partizan Stadium
2008–09	Partizan ‡	**3–0**	Sevojno	Belgrade	Partizan Stadium
2009–10	Red Star	**3–0**	Vojvodina	Belgrade	Partizan Stadium
2010–11	Partizan ‡	**3–0** (offic. res.)^{1}	Vojvodina	Belgrade	Rajko Mitić Stadium
2011–12	Red Star	**2–0**	Borac Čačak	Kruševac	Mladost Stadium
2012–13	Jagodina	**1–0**	Vojvodina	Belgrade	Partizan Stadium
2013–14	Vojvodina	**2–0**	Jagodina	Belgrade	Partizan Stadium
2014–15	Čukarički	**1–0**	Partizan	Belgrade	Rajko Mitić Stadium
2015–16	Partizan	**2–0**	Javor Ivanjica	Gornji Milanovac	Metalac Stadium
2016–17	Partizan ‡	**1–0**	Red Star	Belgrade	Partizan Stadium
2017–18	Partizan	**2–1**	Mladost Lučani	Surdulica	Surdulica City Stadium
2018–19	Partizan	**1–0**	Red Star	Belgrade	Rajko Mitić Stadium
2019–20	Vojvodina	**2–2 (4–2 pen.)**	Partizan	Niš	Čair Stadium
2020–21	Red Star ‡	**0–0 (4–3 pen.)**	Partizan	Belgrade	Rajko Mitić Stadium
2021–22	Red Star ‡	**2–1**	Partizan	Belgrade	Rajko Mitić Stadium
2022–23	Red Star ‡	**2–1**	Čukarički	Belgrade	Rajko Mitić Stadium
2023–24	Red Star ‡	**2–1**	Vojvodina	Loznica	Lagator Stadium
2024–25	Red Star ‡	**3–0**	Vojvodina	Zaječar	Kraljevica Stadium
2025–26	Red Star ‡	**2–2 (5–4 pen.)**	Vojvodina	Loznica	Lagator Stadium
2026–27					

^{1} The match was abandoned in the 83rd minute with Partizan leading 2–1 when Vojvodina walked off to protest the quality of the officiating. Originally, this was declared the final score and the Cup was awarded to Partizan, but on May 16th, 2011, after further investigation from Serbian FA concerning the match, the result was officially registered as a 3–0 win to Partizan.

=== Performance by club ===
Club	Winners	Runners-up	Year(s) Won	Year(s) Runner-up
Red Star	9	2	2007, 2010, 2012, 2021, 2022, 2023, 2024, 2025, 2026	2017, 2019
Partizan	7	4	2008, 2009, 2011, 2016, 2017, 2018, 2019	2015, 2020, 2021, 2022
Vojvodina	2	7	2014, 2020	2007, 2010, 2011, 2013, 2024, 2025, 2026
Jagodina	1	1	2013	2014
Čukarički	1	1	2015	2023
Zemun	-	1		2008
Sevojno	-	1		2009
Borac Čačak	-	1		2012
Javor Ivanjica	-	1		2016
Mladost Lučani	-	1		2018

=== Semi-finals ===
Club	Semi-finalists	Semi-finals years
Partizan	15	2007, **2008**, **2009**, 2010, **2011**, 2012, **2015**, **2016**, **2017**, **2018**, **2019**, **2020**, **2021**, **2022**, 2024
Red Star	15	**2007**, 2008, 2009, **2010**, 2011, **2012**, **2017**, **2019**, 2020, **2021**, **2022**, **2023**, **2024**, **2025**, **2026**
Vojvodina	14	**2007**, **2010**, **2011**, 2012, **2013**, **2014**, 2017, **2020**, 2021, 2022, 2023, **2024**, **2025**, **2026**
Čukarički	5	**2015**, 2017, 2018, 2020, **2023**
OFK Beograd	4	2008, 2010, 2013, 2014
Jagodina	3	**2013**, **2014**, 2015
Banat Zrenjanin	2	2007, 2009
Borac Čačak	2	**2012**, 2016
Javor Ivanjica	2	2013, **2016**
Spartak Subotica	2	2014, 2016
Mladost Lučani	2	**2018**, 2019
TSC	2	2023, 2025
Zemun	1	**2008**
Sevojno	1	**2009**
Sloboda Užice	1	2011
Voždovac	1	2015
Mačva Šabac	1	2018
Radnički Niš	1	2019
Radnik Surdulica	1	2021
Novi Pazar	1	2022
Radnički Kragujevac	1	2024
Napredak Kruševac	1	2025
Grafičar Belgrade	1	2026
Jedinstvo Ub	1	2026

- **Bold** indicates finalist team in season.

== All-time winners (1914–) ==
Total number of national cups won by Serbian clubs. The table also includes titles won in the Serbian Olympic Cup (1914), the Yugoslav Cup (1930–1992), and the Serbia and Montenegro Cup (1992–2006).

Club	Titles	Years won	Runners up
Red Star	30	1948, 1949, 1950, 1958, 1959, 1964, 1968, 1970, 1971, 1982, 1985, 1990, 1993, 1995, 1996, 1997, 1999, 2000, 2002, 2004, 2006, 2007, 2010, 2012, 2021, 2022, 2023, 2024, 2025, 2026	13
Partizan	16	1947, 1952, 1954, 1957, 1989, 1992, 1994, 1998, 2001, 2008, 2009, 2011, 2016, 2017, 2018, 2019	11
OFK Beograd	5	1934, 1953, 1955, 1962, 1966	2
Jugoslavija	3	1914, 1936, 1940	0
Vojvodina	2	2014, 2020	9
Jagodina	1	2013	1
Smederevo	1	2003	1
Čukarički	1	2015	1
Železnik	1	2005	0
SAND	1	1931	0
Naša Krila Zemun	0		2
Spartak Subotica	0		2
Obilić	0		2
Bor	0		1
Radnički Belgrade	0		1
Napredak Kruševac	0		1
Budućnost Banatski Dvor	0		1
Zemun	0		1
Sevojno	0		1
Borac Čačak	0		1
Javor Ivanjica	0		1
Mladost Lučani	0		1
Šumadija 1903	0		1

== Names of the competition ==
- 2006–2010: Lav Serbian Cup
- 2010–2025: Serbian Cup
- 2025–2028: Mozzart Bet Serbian Cup

== See also ==
- Serbian SuperLiga
- List of football clubs in Serbia
- Serbia national football team
- Serbian Olympic Cup
- Yugoslav Cup
- Serbia and Montenegro Cup
