= 1926 Yugoslav Football Championship =

Football league season

The 1926 National Championship (Serbo-Croato-Slovenian: Državno prvenstvo 1926 / Државно првенство 1926) was a football competition held within the Kingdom of Serbs, Croats, and Slovenes. The two dominant teams of pre-World War II Yugoslav football, Jugoslavija and Građanski, began laying the foundations of the next seven decades of a deeply rooted rivalry between Zagreb and Belgrade. Both teams dominated the competition with comfortable margins, but were quite evenly matched in the finals.

== Tournament ==
=== Quarter finals ===
Team 1	Score	Team 2
Građanski Zagreb	7–1	Ilirija
Bačka Subotica	2–12	Jugoslavija
SAŠK	1–2	Hajduk Split
Slavija Osijek	bye	

=== Semi finals ===
Team 1	Score	Team 2
Građanski Zagreb	7–0	Slavija Osijek
Jugoslavija	5–1	Hajduk Split

=== Final ===
Team 1	Score	Team 2
Građanski Zagreb	2–1	Jugoslavija

== Winning squad ==
Champions:

GRAĐANSKI ZAGREB (coach: Imre Poszony)

- Maksimilijan Mihalčić
- Franz Mantler
- Miho Remec
- Miroslav Arnold
- Rudolf Rupec
- Dragutin Vragović
- Géza Ábrahám
- Rudolf Hitrec
- Emil Perška
- Franjo Giler
- Luka Vidnjević

== Top scorers ==
Final goalscoring position, number of goals, player/players and club.

- 1 - 8 goals - Dušan Petković (Jugoslavija)
- 2 - 6 goals - Franjo Giler (Građanski Zagreb)
- 3 - 5 goals - Dragan Jovanović (Jugoslavija)

== See also ==
- Yugoslav Cup
- Yugoslav League Championship
- Football Association of Yugoslavia
