= Alois Machek =

Czech footballer and coach

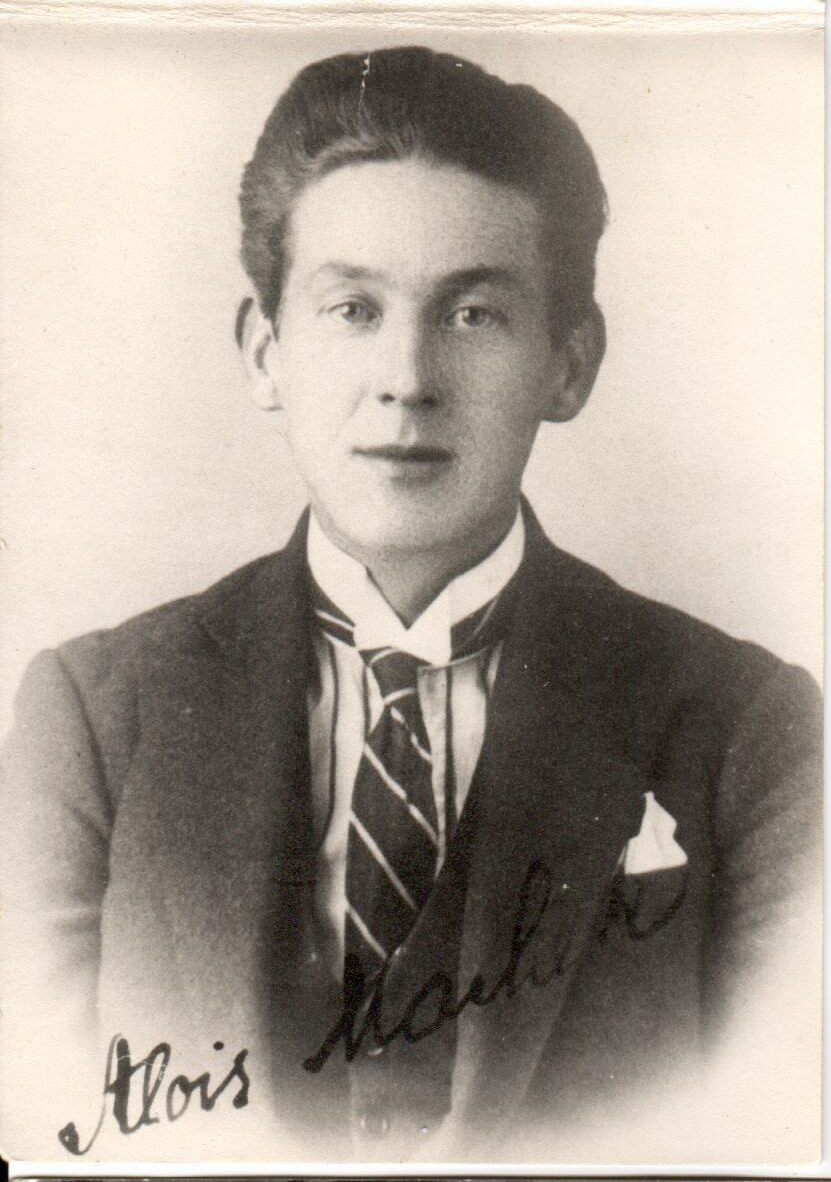
- Alois Lojda Mahek young portrait with his signature

Personal information
- Date of birth: Around 1895
- Place of birth: Hradec Králové, Austro-Hungary
- Place of death: SFR Yugoslavia
- Position: Midfielder

Senior career*
Years	Team	Apps	(Gls)
1911–1912	Hradec Králové		
1912–1913	Český lev Plzeň	1	(0)
1913–1914	Velika Srbija		
191x–191x	Šumadija Kragujevac		
191x–1918	Morava Ćuprija		
1918–1926	SK Jugoslavija	7	(0)
1927–192x	SK Soko		

Managerial career
- 1913–1914: Velika Srbija (player/coach)
- 1914: Srpski mač
- * Club domestic league appearances and goals

Alois Machek (known in Serbian as Alojz Mahek/Алојз Махек) was a Czech football player and coach. Considered by Czech historiographers as one of the best Czech players prior First World War, he was responsible for the popularization of football in Serbia and Yugoslavia during the first two decades of the 20th century.

== Biography ==
Machek was born in Hradec Králové, Kingdom of Bohemia, back then part of Austro-Hungary, nowadays of Czech Republic, Machek started playing football in the local club, FC Hradec Králové debuting for the first team at age of 16. In 1912, he became a metallurgic employee at the Škoda factory in Plzeň and played for SK Češký lev Plzeň. He received a message from his friend and compatriot, Eduard Mifek, who was already playing football in Serbia; Mifek invited him to become a player of a newly founded club, SK Velika Srbija. Machek met an envoy from the club, Serbian footballer Josip Furjanović, in Vienna, who presented him the proposal, and Machek accepted. He arrived in Belgrade, capital of Kingdom of Serbia, in 1913 at the age of 18.

Machek was among the first group of players that formed SK Velika Srbija. The first team was formed by young players Vlada Krstić, Mika Mitić, Mileta Jovanović, Jovan Ružić and Milorad Ilić, plus older and experienced Josip Furjanović, Milivoje Ivanović and Eduard Mifek. The club president Danilo Stojanović, who was also the goalkeeper, also recruited FK Šumadija Kragujevac players Petar Radojković, Mikan Pavlović, Dragoljub Veljković, Milorad Jovanović, Milanče Stefanović, as well as Venčel Petrovický from Bohemia. Besides Machek, Mifek and Perovický were also Czechs. Machek immediately impressed the others with his excellent technique, dribbling and strong shot and, besides being a player, he was also pointed out as team coach. He gained major popularity, and is considered by sports journalist Srbislav Todorović as the sole individual responsible for laying the foundation for modern football in Serbia. He was responsible for introducing the Czech school of football in Serbia, a school which was the most advanced at that time, alongside the Austrian and Hungarian models.

In 1914, in addition to being a coach/player of Velika Srbija, he took charge as coach of another Belgrade club, SK Srpski mač, which became the unofficial champions of Serbia that year. That same year, he played with Velika Srbija for the Serbian Olympic Cup. The final was played between Velika Srbija and Šumadija, and Velika Srbija won 3-1, with Mahek scoring two of the three goals of his team.

All Serbian clubs ceased their activities with the start of the First World War on 15 July 1914, and most players were conscripted to the Serbian Army. Most of the elder players who were not conscripted, along with the foreign ones, left Belgrade and moved south to the interior of Serbia. Machek, along with his compatriots Mifek and Petrovický, were taken by Velika Srbija president Danilo Stojanović to play in Kragujevac with Šumadija, which was another club that Stojadinović had founded earlier. Machek and Petrovický later played at FK Morava Ćuprija, which had just been founded by other players from Belgrade that took refuge there during the war.

At the end of the war in 1918, the Kingdom of Serbs, Croats and Slovenes was formed, renamed to Yugoslavia in 1929. The clubs were restored, and Ajojz Mahek rejoined Velika Srbija, now renamed to SK Jugoslavija. He would play with SK Jugoslavija until 1926. Along with his compatriot Karel Blaha as SK Jugoslavija coach, he went on to be part of the Yugoslav First League championship winning squads in 1924 and 1925; the two national championships crowned his playing career.

He moved to SK Soko in 1927, and lived in Yugoslavia for the rest of his life.

== Honours ==
SK Jugoslavija

- Yugoslav championship: 1924, 1925
- Serbian Olympic Cup: 1914
