= 1923 Yugoslav Football Championship =

1st State Championship
- Season: 1923
- Dates: 2 September – 1 October 1923
- Champions: Građanski Zagreb (1st title)
- Matches: 6
- Goals: 28 (4.67 per match)
- Top goalscorer: Dragan Jovanović (4)

The 1923 Yugoslav Football Championship, officially called State Championship (Serbo-Croatian and Slovene: Državno prvenstvo; Serbian Cyrillic: Државно првенство), was the first season of national association football competition in the Kingdom of Serbs, Croats and Slovenes, which later came to be known as Kingdom of Yugoslavia.

At this point there was no league championship in the modern sense, as the competition was held in a single-legged cup format, with participating clubs qualifying via regional playoffs entered by winners of six regional football sub-federations. Only the final was played over two legs.

The champions were 1. HŠK Građanski from Zagreb, who beat SAŠK from Sarajevo 5–3 in the final tie.

== Qualified clubs ==
Locations of teams in 1923 Yugoslav First League
- JSD Bačka (Subotica Football Subassociation)
- Građanski Zagreb (Zagreb Football Subassociation)
- Hajduk Split (Split Football Subassociation)
- SK Ilirija (Ljubljana Football Subassociation)
- SK Jugoslavija (Belgrade Football Subassociation)
- SAŠK Sarajevo (Sarajevo Football Subassociation)

== Tournament ==
=== Quarter-finals ===
Team 1	Score	Team 2
2 September 1923
SK Jugoslavija	2–1	Bačka
SAŠK	4–3	Hajduk
SK Ilirija	1–2	Građanski

=== Semi-finals ===
Team 1	Score	Team 2
23 September 1923
SAŠK	4–3	SK Jugoslavija
Građanski	bye	

=== Final ===
Team 1	Agg.	Team 2	1st leg	2nd leg
30 September/1 October 1923
Građanski	5–3	SAŠK	1–1	4–2

== Winning squad ==
Champions:

HŠK Građanski (coach: Arthur Gaskell)

- Dragutin Vrđuka
- Fritz Ferderber
- Miho Remec
- Jaroslav Schiffer
- Dragutin Vragović
- Rudolf Rupec
- Rudolf Hitrec
- Dragutin Babić
- Stjepan Pasinek
- Antun Pavleković
- Franjo Mantler
- Emil Perška
- Bela Šefer
- Stebl
- Gec

== Top scorers ==
Final goalscoring position, number of goals, player/players and club.

- 1 - 4 goals - Dragan Jovanović (Jugoslavija)
- 2 - 3 goals - Jakupec (SAŠK)
- 3 - 2 goals - Franz Mantler, Dragutin Babić, Emil Perška (all Građanski Zagreb), Nedžad Sulejmanpašić and Dragutin Sieber (SAŠK)

== See also ==
- Yugoslav Cup
- Yugoslav Football Championship
- Football Association of Yugoslavia
