= Dušan Petković =

Dušan Petković may refer to:

- Dušan Petković (footballer, born 1974), Serbian former footballer
- Dušan Petković (footballer, born 1903) (1903–1979), Serbian and Yugoslav football forward
- Dušan Petković (volleyball) (born 1992), Serbian volleyball player
