= 1924 Yugoslav Football Championship =

Državno prvenstvo Kraljevine Srba, Hrvata i Slovenaca
- Season: 1924
- Dates: 7 September — 12 October 1924
- Champions: SK Jugoslavija (1st title)
- Goals: 40
- Average goals/game: 5.71
- Top goalscorer: Dragan Jovanović (6)

The 1924 National Championship (Serbo-Croato-Slovenian: Državno prvenstvo 1924. / Државно првенство 1924.) held in the Kingdom of Serbs, Croats and Slovenes was the second nationwide domestic football competition. At this point there was no league championship in the modern sense as the competition was held in a single-legged cup format, with participating clubs qualifying via regional playoffs organised by regional football subfederations.

== Qualified clubs ==
Locations of teams in 1924 Yugoslav First League
- Somborski SK (Subotica Football Subfederation)
- Građanski Zagreb (Zagreb Football Subfederation)
- Slavija Osijek (Osijek Football Subfederation)
- Hajduk Split (Split Football Subfederation)
- SK Ilirija (Ljubljana Football Subfederation)
- SK Jugoslavija (Belgrade Football Subfederation)
- SAŠK Sarajevo (Sarajevo Football Subfederation)

== Tournament ==
=== Quarter-finals ===
Team 1	Agg.	Team 2	1st leg	2nd leg
7/8 September 1924
SK Jugoslavija	5–2	Slavija		
SK Ilirija	1–3	SAŠK		
Hajduk	9–4	Građanski	4–4	5–0
Somborski SK	bye			

=== Semi-finals ===
Team 1	Score	Team 2
21 September 1924
Somborski SK	1–5	SK Jugoslavija
SAŠK	1–6	Hajduk

=== Finals ===
Team 1	Score	Team 2
12 October 1924
SK Jugoslavija	2–1	Hajduk Split

Note: The match was played in Zagreb.

== Winning squad ==
Champions:

SK JUGOSLAVIJA (coach: (Czech Republic) Karel Bláha)
Nationality, name, (caps/goals)

- (Hungary) Károly Nemes (3/0)
- (Kingdom of Yugoslavia) Milutin Ivković (3/0)
- (Kingdom of Yugoslavia) Branko Petrović (2/0)
- (Kingdom of Yugoslavia) Mihailo Načević (3/0)
- (Kingdom of Yugoslavia) Boško Todorić (1/0)
- (Kingdom of Yugoslavia) Sveta Marković (3/0)
- (Czechoslovakia) Alois Machek (3/0)
- (Kingdom of Yugoslavia) Damjan Đurić (3/1)
- (Kingdom of Yugoslavia) Dragan Jovanović (3/4)
- (Kingdom of Yugoslavia) Stevan Luburić (3/3)
- (Kingdom of Yugoslavia) Dušan Petković (3/4)
- (Kingdom of Yugoslavia) Branislav Sekulić (3/0)

== Top scorers ==
Final goalscoring position, number of goals, player/players and club.

- 1 - 6 goals - Dragan Jovanović (Jugoslavija)
- 2 - 3 goals - Stevan Luburić (Jugoslavija), Antun Bonačić, Ljubo Benčić, Vinko Radić (all Hajduk Split)

== See also ==
- Yugoslav Cup
- Yugoslav Football Championship
- Football Association of Yugoslavia
