= Jenő Ábrahám =

Hungarian and Yugoslav international football player

Personal information
- Full name: Jenő Ábrahám
- Date of birth: 1903
- Place of birth: Szeged, Austria-Hungary
- Date of death: 1973 (aged 69-70)
- Position: Midfielder

Senior career*
Years	Team	Apps	(Gls)
–1922	Szeged		
1922–1924	Vojvodina		
1924–1925	Szeged		
1925–1926	Građanski Zagreb	3	(1)
1926–1930	Bástya	41	(5)

International career
1922–1923	Kingdom of Serbs, Croats and Slovenes	2	(2)
- * Club domestic league appearances and goals

Jenő Ábrahám (Serbo-Croatian: Jene Abraham, Јене Абрахам; 1903 – 1973) was a Hungarian footballer who represented the Kingdom of Serbs, Croats and Slovenes at international level.

While playing in Yugoslavia, he was recorded in the chronicles as "Saraz", a Serbo-Croatian transliteration of the Hungarian word "Száraz", which means "Dry" in Hungarian, a name he received probably because of his looks. Many websites confuse Jenő Ábrahám with Eugen "Geza" Ábrahám. The two played in SK Vojvodina in same time, and usually the first was recorded as Saraz I and the second as Saraz II. Many football-specialized internet websites merged the two and erroneously named the player described in this article as Geza Abraham Sarasz.

== Club career ==
Born in Szeged, Hungary, he started playing in his hometown club Szegedi AK (SZAK). In 1922 he came to Yugoslavia to play in SK Vojvodina. In September 1924 he was back in Hungary playing with SZAK. In summer 1925 he moved to another Yugoslav club, the Zagreb giants 1. HŠK Građanski where he would play one season and win the 1926 Yugoslav First League. He usually played as left-winger. In 1926 he left Yugoslavia and joined Bástya playing with them in the Hungarian Championship between 1926 and 1930.

== International career ==
Between 1922 and 1923, he played two matches for the Yugoslavia national football team while playing with Vojvodina having scored two goals. He participated, and scored twice, in the friendly match played on 28 July 1922 in Zagreb against Czechoslovakia, which was a first ever win of the Yugoslavia national team, with a final result of 4–3. His other, and last, match was a year later, on 3 July 1923, in a friendly match in Kraków, against Poland, a 2–1 win.
