= 1925 Yugoslav Football Championship =

Football tournament

The 1925 National Championship (Serbo-Croato-Slovenian: Državno prvenstvo 1925. / Државно првенство 1925.) was the third edition of the annual football competition in the Kingdom of Serbs, Croats and Slovenes.

Jugoslavija successfully pursued the 1925 title against Građanski Zagreb, 2–3 (aet). Jugoslavija was the second club from Belgrade to win the title.

== Qualified clubs ==
Locations of teams in 1925 Yugoslav First League
- Bačka Subotica (Subotica Football Subfederation)
- Građanski Zagreb (Zagreb Football Subfederation)
- Slavija Osijek (Osijek Football Subfederation)
- Hajduk Split (Split Football Subfederation)
- Ilirija Ljubljana (Ljubljana Football Subfederation)
- SK Jugoslavija Belgrade (Belgrade Football Subfederation)
- SAŠK Sarajevo (Sarajevo Football Subfederation)

== Tournament ==
=== Quarter finals ===
Team 1	Score	Team 2
Ilirija	0–3	Bačka Subotica
Građanski Zagreb	6–0	SAŠK
Jugoslavija	3–2 (a.e.t.)	Hajduk Split
Slavija Osijek	bye	

=== Semi finals ===
Team 1	Score	Team 2
Bačka Subotica	0–2	Građanski Zagreb
Jugoslavija	3–2	Slavija Osijek

=== Final ===
Team 1	Score	Team 2
Građanski Zagreb	2–3 (a.e.t.)	Jugoslavija

== Winning squad ==
Champions:

SK JUGOSLAVIJA (coach: Karel Blaha)

- Károly Nemes
- Milutin Ivković
- Branko Petrović
- Mihailo Načević
- Alois Machek
- Sveta Marković
- Đorđe Đorđević
- Boško Todorić
- Dragan Jovanović
- Stevan Luburić
- Vladeta Đurić
- Dušan Petković
- Branislav Sekulić
- Petar Joksimović

== Top scorers ==
Final goalscoring position, number of goals, player/players and club.

- 1 - 4 goals - Dragan Jovanović (Jugoslavija)
- 2 - 3 goals - Branislav Sekulić (Jugoslavija)
- 3 - 2 goals - Dušan Petković (Jugoslavija), Rudolf Hitrec, Franjo Giler, Emil Perška, Luka Vidnjević (all Građanski Zagreb)

== See also ==
- Yugoslav Cup
- Yugoslav League Championship
- Football Association of Yugoslavia
