= Robert Lang (football manager) =

Austrian football manager (1886–1941)

Personal information
- Date of birth: 26 October 1886
- Place of birth: Vienna, Austria-Hungary
- Date of death: 14 November 1941 (aged 55)
- Position: Midfielder

Senior career*
Years	Team	Apps	(Gls)
1902–1909	Vienna Cricket and Football-Club		
1921	SK Jugoslavija		

Managerial career
- 1924–1927: 1. Simmeringer SC
- 1926–1928: Austria (Asst)
- 1927–1928: Wacker Wien
- 1928–1931: Austria Wien
- FC Neumünster Zürich
- 1938–1939: FC Luzern
- 1939–1940: SK Jugoslavija
- * Club domestic league appearances and goals

Robert Lang (26 October 1886 – 14 November 1941) was an Austrian football player and coach.

== Career ==
As player Lang played with Vienna Cricket and Football-Club between 1902 and 1909 (the club was renamed to FK Austria Wien in 1926). While representing Vienna Cricket & FC he played for the city team of Vienna against Leipzig in 1903 and the city team of Berlin in 1905, 1906 and 1907. He also played in 1921 with Yugoslav side SK Jugoslavija.

He coached 1. Simmeringer SC in the seasons 1924–25, 1925–26 and 1926–27, Wacker Wien in the 1927–28 season, next Austria Wien in the seasons 1928–29, 1929–30 and 1930–31. In the season 1938–39 he coached Swiss side FC Luzern. and in the following season, 1939–40, he coached Yugoslav side SK Jugoslavija.

He also managed the Austria national team in friendly matches during 1926. Then he replaced Austria coach Hugo Meisl in the 1926 game against Czechoslovakia, and then again in the 1928 games against Czechoslovakia and Yugoslavia.

He also coached Swiss club FC Neumünster Zürich.
