= Johann Strnad =

Austrian footballer and manager

Hans Strnad
Personal information
- Full name: Hans Johann Strnad
- Date of birth: Around 1893
- Place of birth: Vienna, Austria-Hungary
- Date of death: Around 1950

Senior career*
Years	Team	Apps	(Gls)
1916–1920	Wiener Sport-Club		
1921–1925	DFC Prag		
1925–1927	Wiener Sport-Club		

International career
1918	Austria	1	(0)

Managerial career
- 1927–1928: 1. FC Katowice
- 1928–1929: SK Jugoslavija
- 1930: Czarni Lwów
- 1930–1931: Građanski Zagreb
- 1931: SK Jugoslavija
- 1932–1933: HAŠK
- 1933–1934: Wiener Sport-Club
- 1936–1937: Wiener Sport-Club
- 1947: Wacker Wien
- 1948–1949: Panathinaikos
- * Club domestic league appearances and goals

Johann "Hans" Strnad (~1893 – ~1950) was an Austrian football manager and player.

== Club career ==
Born in Vienna. While playing with Wiener Sport-Club, he played one match for the Austria national football team on April 14, 1918 in a match in Budapest against Hungary. He also played with DFC Prag.

Johann Strnad later became a coach. He coached 1. FC Katowice (1927–1928), SK Jugoslavija between 1928 and 1929, Czarni Lwów (1930) and, again, SK Jugoslavija (1931). By the time in Belgrad he was replaced by Dragan Jovanović, he was receiving a salary of 6,000 dinars. For a short period between 18 October 1930 and 18 February 1931, he coached Građanski Zagreb. In 1933 he returned to Austria and became coach of his former club Wiener Sport-Club which he will coach in two periods, between 1933 and 1934, and 1936 and 1937. In 1947 coached Wacker Wien.

He also coached another Yugoslav club, HAŠK in the 1933 Yugoslav Football Championship.

== International career ==
Hans Strnad made one appearance for the Austria national team it was on April 14, 1918, in Budapest against Hungary, a 2–0 defeat.
