= 1929 Yugoslav Football Championship =

Football league season

The 1929 National Championship (Serbo-Croato-Slovenian: Državno prvenstvo 1929. / Државно првенство 1929.) was won by Hajduk Split.

The season was marked by a major controversy at the end. BSK Belgrade finished the season at top, however because they fielded an unregistered player, they had to replay their two last matches. Having refused to play the first one against their Belgrade rivals Jugoslavija, a 3-0 defeat was registered, and later their 2-1 victory over Hajduk was not enough to grant them the title.

Bosnian club SAŠK dissolved before the season began and the clubs participating was reduced to five, all Serbian or Croatian. 1929 was the first year in which the championship used a double round-robin style league, and so the stats for each team began having higher numbers.

== Controversial end of the championship ==
The season featured a good deal of controversy as the team that finished the season in top spot was BSK, not Hajduk Split. However, because they were judged to have had an improperly registered player on their roster (Dušan Marković), BSK got ordered by the FA to replay their last two matches of the season: home match against SK Jugoslavija and the away match at Hajduk Split (both of which BSK originally won: 5-1 and 3-1, respectively). Furious with what they considered to be an unfair decision, BSK refused to re-play the matches. They didn't show up to replay their arch cross-town rivals SK Jugoslavija and the match was eventually registered 3-0 in Jugoslavija's favour. As for re-playing the second match at Hajduk, BSK originally also refused, but were eventually forced to travel to Split by the FA under a threat of heavy sanctions. Though re-gathered and put together in hasty fashion, BSK players still managed to beat Hajduk 2-1. However, it still wasn't enough for the title as Hajduk had more points due to BSK refusal to play Jugoslavija.

BSK appealed, launching a formal complaint with the FA (Jugoslovenski nogometni savez). Their appeal was scheduled to be heard during the next scheduled FA assembly that took place on March 24, 1929, at the FA headquarters in Zagreb. The initiative for the relocation of FA headquarters from Zagreb to Belgrade was also discussed at the same assembly, causing high tensions and incidents that even police had to intervene. The assembly was interrupted and stopped following the incident, which meant that BSK's appeal was not even discussed.

== Qualifiers ==
This season introduced a change in which there was no longer directly qualified teams, and this meant that all teams had to go through one round of qualifiers. As in previous seasons, the subassociations of Belgrade and Zagreb provided the first two teams, while the access to the rest of the subassociations was only provided to the correspondent subassociation champion.

The representatives were:

- Subassociation of Belgrade: BSK Belgrade and SK Jugoslavija
- Subassociation of Zagreb: HAŠK and Građanski Zagreb
- Subassociation of Ljubljana: Primorje
- Subassociation of Osijek: Hajduk Osijek
- Subassociation of Sarajevo: Slavija
- Subassociation of Skoplje: Pobeda Skoplje
- Subassociation of Split: Hajduk Split
- Subassociation of Subotica: SAND Subotica

Qualifying round:

- BSK – Pobeda Skoplje 7:2, 0:1
- SAND – Jugoslavija 0:1, 1:3
- HAŠK – Hajduk Osijek 1:1, 3:0
- Primorje – Građanski Zagreb 1:3, 0:4
- Hajduk Split – Slavija Sarajevo 2:1, 2:1

The first leg was played on June 2, and the second on June 9.

== League ==
Pos	Team	Pld	W	D	L	GF	GA	GR	Pts
1	Hajduk Split	8	5	2	1	25	15	1.667	12
2	BSK	8	4	2	2	18	16	1.125	10
3	SK Jugoslavija	8	3	2	3	14	10	1.400	8
4	HAŠK	8	3	1	4	15	15	1.000	7
5	Građanski Zagreb	8	1	1	6	8	24	0.333	3

Source: rsssf.org

== Results ==
Home \ Away	BSK	GRA	HAJ	HŠK	JUG
BSK Belgrade		5–1	5–5	2–1	0–3 (Note: The matches Hajduk - BSK 1–3 and BSK - Jugoslavija 5–1 were canceled, and new ones were played after all the championship matches played. In protest, BSK played a friendly match with Jugoslavija (3–3), and handed over the championship match without a fight (0–3).)
Građanski Zagreb	1–1		2–4	0–3	2–0
Hajduk Split	1–2	4–1		5–2	4–2
HAŠK	3–1	3–1	1–2		2–2
SK Jugoslavija	1–2	4–0	0–0	2–0	

Source: DataSoccer.it
Legend: Blue = home team win; Yellow = draw; Red = away team win.

== Winning squad ==
Champions:

HAJDUK SPLIT (coach: Luka Kaliterna)

- Bartul Čulić
- Janko Rodin
- Ivan Montana
- Veljko Poduje
- Miroslav Dešković
- Marko Mikačić
- Šime Poduje
- Veljko Radić
- Ljubo Benčić
- Branko Bakotić
- Antun Bonačić
- Leo Lemešić

== Top scorers ==
Final goalscoring position, number of goals, player/players and club.

- 1 - 10 goals - Đorđe Vujadinović (BSK Belgrade)
- 2 - 7 goals - Ljubo Benčić (Hajduk Split)
- 3 - 6 goals - Blagoje Marjanović (BSK Belgrade), Ivan Hitrec (HAŠK)

== See also ==
- Yugoslav Cup
- Yugoslav League Championship
- Football Association of Yugoslavia
