= Károly Nemes =

Hungarian footballer and coach

Károly Nemes Dragutin Nemeš
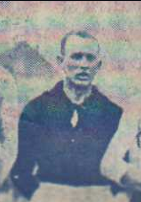

Personal information
- Date of birth: 1895
- Place of birth: Budapest, Austria-Hungary
- Position: Goalkeeper

Senior career*
Years	Team	Apps	(Gls)
1914–1915	MTK Budapest		
1915–1916	Wiener Sport-Club	2	(0)
1917–1919	Rapid Wien	27	(0)
1920–1924	NAK Novi Sad		
1924–1925	SK Jugoslavija	6	(0)

Managerial career
- 1930: AS-23
- 1930: Bulgaria
- 1930–1931: Luzern
- 1932: Vojvodina
- 1933: SK Jugoslavija
- 1935: Vojvodina
- 1935–1937: NAK Novi Sad
- 1940: Vojvodina
- * Club domestic league appearances and goals

Károly Nemes, also known as Dragutin Nemeš, was a Hungarian football goalkeeper and coach. He is best known for his work on champion teams of SK Rapid Wien and SK Jugoslavija. He coached throughout Central and South-Eastern Europe.

== Career ==
=== Player ===
He played with Wiener Sport-Club and next MTK Budapest and then became the first foreigner to play in SK Rapid Wien. He played two seasons with Rapid, between 1917 and 1919, and, after serving as vice-champion in 1917–18. A year later he won the double, the 1918–19 Austrian football championship and the 1919 Austrian Cup. He played a total of 27 league matches for Rapid.

In 1920 he moved to Yugoslavia, then known as the Kingdom of Serbs, Croats and Slovenes, where he continued his career. Initially he joined NAK Novi Sad and later was brought to Belgrade to join SK Jugoslavija and win the Yugoslav Championship two times in a row, in 1924 and 1925. He made 6 appearances in those two seasons in the Yugoslav championship and many more in the First League of the Belgrade Football Subassociation. While in Yugoslavia he became commonly known either as Karlo or Dragutin Nemeš.

=== Coach ===
Nemes coaching abilities were characterised as of the avant-garde Central European school, noted for his psychological preparation of the team before matches, beside a developed work in the physical condition of the players.

In 1928 he was brought by SK Vojvodina president Kosta Hadži to Novi Sad where he first coached, briefly replacing main coach Otto Neczas. He was the coach of the Bulgarian national team in 1930. Between Summer 1930 and September 1931 he coached Swiss side FC Luzern. He had a second coaching spell with Vojvodina in 1932, staying for almost two years.

He coached his former team SK Jugoslavija in 1933. Then he coached NAK Novi Sad winning with them the Novi Sad Football Subassociation League and a third place in the 1936 Yugoslav Football Championship. He coached in Germany, Switzerland and Bulgaria. During the 1930s he also coached Cibalia Vinkovci.

He later moved to Hungary and lived in Jánoshalma.

== Honours ==
=== Player ===
Rapid Wien

- Austrian Championship: 1918–19
- Austrian Cup: 1919

SK Jugoslavija

- Yugoslav Championship: 1924, 1925

=== Coach ===
NAK Novi Sad

- Novi Sad Subassociation League: 1936
