= Arthur Gaskell =

English footballer

Personal information
- Full name: Arthur Gaskell
- Date of birth: 26 April 1886
- Place of birth: Bollington, England
- Date of death: 22 August 1944 (aged 58)
- Place of death: Rochdale, England
- Position: Wing half

Senior career*
| Years | Team | Apps | (Gls) |
| 1905–1910 | Bolton Wanderers | 105 | (2) |
| 1910–1911 | Macclesfield | | |
| Total | | 105 | (2) |

Managerial career
- 1920-1921: Grasshopper
- 1921–1924: Građanski Zagreb
- * Club domestic league appearances and goals

Arthur Gaskell (26 April 1886 – 22 August 1944) was an English footballer who played in the Football League for Bolton Wanderers. After his playing career was over Gaskell became a coach and went on to manage the Moscow City team in 1911 - 1912. He was the first foreign manager in the Russian Empire. He also managed Swiss side Grasshopper Club Zürich and then Yugoslav side HŠK Građanski Zagreb where he won the 1923 Yugoslav Football Championship.
