= First League of Serbia and Montenegro =

- Founded: 1992
- Folded: 2006
- Country: Serbia and Montenegro
- Confederation: UEFA
- Number of clubs: 16
- Level on pyramid: 1
- Relegation to: Second League of Serbia and Montenegro (1992–2005); Serbian First League (2005–2006); Montenegrin First League (2005–2006)
- Domestic cup: Serbia and Montenegro Cup
- International cup(s): UEFA Champions League; UEFA Cup; UEFA Intertoto Cup
- Last champions: Red Star Belgrade (2005–06)
- Most championships: Partizan (8 titles)

The First League of Serbia and Montenegro (Serbian: Прва лига Србије и Црне Горе / Prva liga Srbije i Crne Gore) was the top football league of Serbia and Montenegro, before the country's dissolution in 2006. The league was formed as the First League of FR Yugoslavia following the breakup of Yugoslavia in 1992, effectively succeeding the Yugoslav First League. Prior to its final 2005–06 season, the league became known as the Serbia and Montenegro Super League.

From 1993 to 1998, the league abandoned the traditional single-league structure, which was used in the first season, and the division was split into two groups; Group A (known as IA) for the top-seeded teams and Group B (IB) for the other teams. Until 1995–96, the bottom four teams of the IA group were replaced with the top four teams of IB after the first half of the season, once all teams have played each other in their respective group twice. From 1996–97, the system of replacing teams in each group mid-season was scrapped and was only applied at the end of the season. As a consequence, all teams in each group played each other three times a season, playing each other once at home and once away at least. This two-group format was abandoned after the 1997–98 season and the league reverted to the single-league structure.

The republics of Serbia and Montenegro remained united as the Federal Republic of Yugoslavia, political reform in the country saw it renamed to Serbia and Montenegro in 2003. After Montenegro gained independence in June 2006, the league ceased to exist and has been succeeded by the Serbian Super League and the Montenegrin First League.

== History ==
The league just followed the seasons from the Yugoslav First League and for long it did not even consider itself separated from it. For instance, in 1992 there was no inaugural season, all that happened was that clubs from the republics that proclaimed independence left the league, and their places were replaced by teams from Serbia and Montenegro which were next in line. The organizer, the Football Association of Yugoslavia kept same president and same people in charge of the competition. The same FA was running the Yugoslavia national team that qualified for the 1992 UEFA European Championship, however, with the start of the Yugoslav Wars and the responsibility put only on Serbia and Montenegro, it is this two republics, which formed the FR Yugoslavia, that suffered the economic sanctions that banned both national team and clubs, from participating in international competitions. Some clubs such as FK Borac Banja Luka showed solidarity by staying within Yugoslav league system, despite being part of a territory belonging to a republic that declared independence, and got it recognized.

== Champions ==
Team	No. of titles	Winning seasons	Runners-up
Partizan	8	1992–93, 1993–94, 1995–96, 1996–97, 1998–99, 2001–02, 2002–03, 2004–05	5
Red Star Belgrade	5	1994–95, 1999–2000, 2000–01, 2003–04, 2005–06	8
Obilić	1	1997–98	1

== Seasons ==
Season	Champions	Runners-up	Third place	Top scorer(s)	Goals
1992–93	Partizan (12)	Red Star Belgrade	Vojvodina	(Federal Republic of Yugoslavia) Anto Drobnjak (Red Star Belgrade) (Federal Republic of Yugoslavia) Vesko Mihajlović (Vojvodina)	22
1993–94	Partizan (13)	Red Star Belgrade	Vojvodina	(Federal Republic of Yugoslavia) Savo Milošević (Partizan)	21
1994–95	Red Star Belgrade (20)	Partizan	Vojvodina	(Federal Republic of Yugoslavia) Savo Milošević (Partizan)	30
1995–96	Partizan (14)	Red Star Belgrade	Vojvodina	(Federal Republic of Yugoslavia) Vojislav Budimirović (Čukarički)	23
1996–97	Partizan (15)	Red Star Belgrade	Vojvodina	(Federal Republic of Yugoslavia) Zoran Jovičić (Red Star Belgrade)	21
1997–98	Obilić (1)	Red Star Belgrade	Partizan	(Federal Republic of Yugoslavia) Saša Marković (Železnik / Red Star Belgrade)	27
1998–99	Partizan (16)	Obilić	Red Star Belgrade	(Federal Republic of Yugoslavia) Dejan Osmanović (Hajduk Kula)	16
1999–00	Red Star Belgrade (21)	Partizan	Obilić	(Federal Republic of Yugoslavia) Mateja Kežman (Partizan)	27
2000–01	Red Star Belgrade (22)	Partizan	Obilić	(Federal Republic of Yugoslavia) Petar Divić (OFK Beograd)	27
2001–02	Partizan (17)	Red Star Belgrade	Sartid	(Federal Republic of Yugoslavia) Zoran Đurašković (Mladost Lučani)	27
2002–03	Partizan (18)	Red Star Belgrade	OFK Beograd	(Federal Republic of Yugoslavia) Zvonimir Vukić (Partizan)	22
2003–04	Red Star Belgrade (23)	Partizan	Železnik	(Serbia and Montenegro) Nikola Žigić (Red Star Belgrade)	19
2004–05	Partizan (19)	Red Star Belgrade	Zeta	(Serbia and Montenegro) Marko Pantelić (Red Star Belgrade)	21
2005–06	Red Star Belgrade (24)	Partizan	Voždovac	(Serbia and Montenegro) Srđan Radonjić (Partizan)	20

== See also ==
- Yugoslav First League
- Serbian Super League
- Montenegrin First League
- List of Serbian football champions
- List of football clubs in Serbia
- List of football clubs in Montenegro
