= Branislav Sekulić =

Serbian footballer and manager

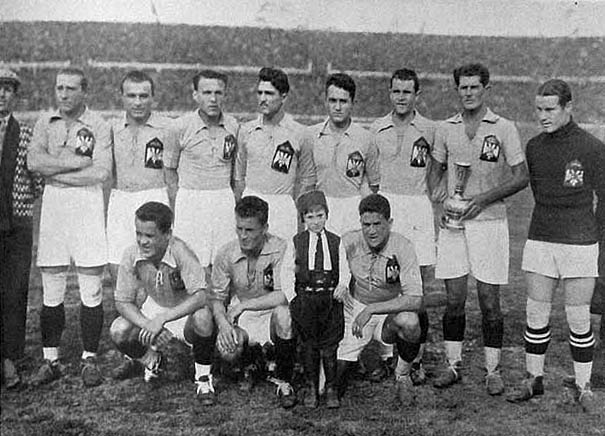
- Yugoslavia national team in 1930

Personal information
- Date of birth: 29 October 1906
- Place of birth: Belgrade, Kingdom of Serbia
- Date of death: 24 September 1968 (aged 61)
- Place of death: Bern, Switzerland
- Position: Forward

Youth career
- Javor Beograd

Senior career*
Years	Team	Apps	(Gls)
- Dušanovac
- Karađorđe Beograd
1923–1926	Jugoslavija	9	(6)
1927–1929	SO Montpellier		
1929–1930	Club Français		
1930–1931	Grasshopper		
1931–1934	Urania Genève Sport		
1934–1935	Jugoslavija	15	(6)
1937–1939	Jedinstvo Beograd	36	(3)
1942–1943	Jedinstvo Beograd		

International career
1925–1936	Yugoslavia	17	(8)

Managerial career
- 1934: Jugoslavija
- Dinamo Vinkovci
- 1946: Red Star Belgrade
- 1948–1951: Vojvodina
- 1952: Red Star Belgrade
- Spartak Subotica
- 1957–1962: Fribourg
- 1958–1960: Switzerland
- 1962–1963: FC Liège
- 1964–1965: Young Fellows Juventus
- * Club domestic league appearances and goals

Branislav "Bane" Sekulić (Serbian Cyrillic: Бранислав "Бане" Секулић; 29 October 1906 – 24 September 1968) was a Yugoslav football manager and player.

== Career ==
He began playing with the youth team of Javor Beograd before moving to Dušanovac. Being only 15 he became senior and the youngest but also best player at Karađorđe Beograd where he moved from Dušanovac along his brother Dragutin. SK Soko Beograd brought him next but he only played with the youth team while with them. Next he was spotted by SK Jugoslavija where he joined a generation of players such as Marjanović, Dragićević, Luburić and Đurić, winning with them the 1924 and 1925 Yugoslav Championships. He was characterised for having an impressive physical condition and for being very offensive, great sprinter, and having great ability for a center, besides being the owner of a powerful shot. His speciality was the volley shot which was curiously considered to be elegant and soft but very efficient. His talent was soon spotted by foreign clubs and he moved to France and later Switzerland where he represented SO Montpellier, Club Français, Grasshopper Club Zürich and Urania Genève Sport. When he returned to Yugoslavia he first joined SK Jugoslavija before moving to SK Jedinstvo Beograd. His healthy way of life allowed him to become one of the Yugoslav players with longest active playing career and to play with Jedinstvo in the championship until almost his 40s.

He was part of the Yugoslavia national football team that reached the semi-finals of the 1930 FIFA World Cup. He earned a total of 17 caps (no goals) and played his final international away against France in December 1936.

He coached Cibalia, Red Star Belgrade, FC Fribourg, Switzerland, RFC Liège and SC Young Fellows Juventus.

== Honours ==
=== Player ===
SK Jugoslavija

- Yugoslav Championship: 1924, 1925
