= 1941–42 Serbian League =

Serbian League
- Season: 1941-42
- Champions: SK 1913
- Matches: 89
- Goals: 347 (3.9 per match)

The 1941–42 Serbian League (Serbian: 1941–42 Српска лига / 1941–42 Srpska liga) was a top level football league of the German military administration in Serbia (Serbia under German occupation) in the 1941–42 season. It was won by SK 1913.

== Final table ==
Final table seen at September 15, 1942, at Sport newspaper.

Pos	Team	Pld	W	D	L	GF	GA	GD	Pts
1	1913	18	14	3	1	73	11	+62	31
2	BSK	18	13	3	2	76	13	+63	29
3	Vitez	18	10	3	5	34	31	+3	23
4	Mitić	18	7	4	7	19	30	−11	18
5	ČSK	17	6	4	7	29	27	+2	16
6	BASK	18	7	1	10	26	35	−9	15
7	Obilić	17	6	2	9	28	36	−8	14
8	Sloga	17	6	2	9	24	37	−13	14
9	Jedinstvo	18	7	0	11	25	42	−17	14
10	Balkan	18	1	2	15	13	85	−72	4

== See also ==
- Serbian Football League (1940–1944)
- Serbia under German occupation
