= Danilo Stojanović =

Personal information
- Full name: Danilo Stojanović
- Date of birth: 14 September 1878
- Place of birth: Lapovo, Serbia
- Date of death: 23 April 1967 (aged 88)
- Place of death: Belgrade, SFR Yugoslavia
- Position: Goalkeeper

Senior career*
Years	Team	Apps	(Gls)
1903–1906	Šumadija 1903		
1906–1911	SK Soko		
1912–1913	Dušanovac		
1913–1914	Velika Srbija		

Managerial career
- 1922–1923: Jugoslavija
- * Club domestic league appearances and goals

Danilo Stojanović (Serbian Cyrillic: Данило Стојановић, pronounced [danǐlo stojǎːnoʋitɕ]; 14 September 1878 – 23 April 1967), commonly known as Čika Dača, was one of the football pioneers in the Kingdom of Serbia.

== Life ==
On 14 September 1903, he formed the first football club in the Kingdom of Serbia (which then excluded Vojvodina), the FK Šumadija becoming its president until 1906, when he moved to Belgrade. In 1911 he was a founding member of BSK where he became vice-president. However, a year later, after disagreements with the direction, he left BSK and became president of another Belgrade club, SK Dušanovac. With the start of the Balkan War he joined the Serbian Army and was relocated to Kragujevac. At the end of the war he returned to Belgrade and he formed, along with a group of dissidents from BSK, the SK Velika Srbija on 1 August 1913.

The First World War begin in 1914 and after the end, in 1918, the Kingdom of Serbs, Croats and Slovenes was formed, which was colloquially known as Yugoslavia, so the club changed its name to SK Jugoslavija as Velika Srbija meant Great Serbia, a name now obsolete as all the focus was going towards the new country. He was also the coach of Jugoslavija between 1923 and 1924. In 1926 he left Jugoslavija, however during the period he was at the club, Jugoslavija won two national championships and became one of the biggest clubs in the country. After leaving the direction board of Jugoslavija, he did not abandon football, but instead he was a directing member of many sports organizations staying attached to his passion, football, throughout the rest of his life. In 1951 he published a book Čika Dačine uspomene (Čika Dača's Memories).

Despite mostly known as the founder of some of the major Serbian clubs in that period, he also had an active playing career as well. Initially teams in Serbia had one weak spot, the goalkeeper, because initially most players avoided playing in that harsh position. Stojanović started a career as goalkeeper at the club he was president, Šumadija, where he played from 1903 until 1906. Then he moved to the capital where he actually played as left-winger while with SK Soko where he stayed until 1910. After spending over a year at the direction of BSK, he moved to SK Dušanovac where his presidential position did not prevent him from taking the goalkeeping role occasionally and he was also the coach in the club during 1912. Then, between 1913 and 1914 he played for SK Velika Srbija. He was known for always wearing white and his elegance was always appreciated by the spectators.

He died in Belgrade in 1967.
