= Serbian Olympic Cup =

- Status: active
- Genre: sports competition
- Date: July–August
- Frequency: annual
- Location: various
- Inaugurated: 1914

Serbian Olympic Cup was a football competition organized by Olympic Committee of Serbia in spring of 1914 between the most successful Serbian clubs.

It was played in cup format as single round-robin system and was known as Srpski kup (Serbian Cup) or Srpski Olimpijski Kup (Serbian Olympic Cup). The winner of the first ever Serbian football tournament was SK Velika Srbija The final was played on May 11, 1914, in Košutnjak, Belgrade, home ground of SK Soko. It was the pioneer football competition organised in the Kingdom of Serbia.

== Final ==
Serbian Olympic Cup
May 11, 1914
Final

| SK Velika Srbija | 3 – 1 | SK Šumadija Kragujevac |
|---|---|---|
| Machek; Jovanović | | Trifunović |

Stadium of SK Soko, Košutnjak, Belgrade
