= Zoran Đurašković =

Serbian footballer

Personal information
- Full name: Zoran Đurašković
- Date of birth: 7 July 1975 (age 51)
- Place of birth: Bar, SFR Yugoslavia
- Height: 1.80 m (5 ft 11 in)
- Position: Striker

Senior career*
Years	Team	Apps	(Gls)
- Mornar Bar
- Bokelj
1996–1998	Hajduk Beograd		
1998–1999	Mogren	2	(0)
1999–2002	Mladost Lučani	72	(52)
2002–2005	Železnik	78	(36)
2005–2009	Smederevo	63	(15)
2009–2010	Petrovac	14	(2)
Total		229	(105)

Managerial career
- 2023–2025: FK Mornar
- 2025–2026: FK Dečić
- 2026–: OFK Petrovac
- * Club domestic league appearances and goals

Zoran Đurašković (Serbian Cyrillic: Зоран Ђурашковић; born 7 July 1975) is a Montenegrin retired footballer.

== Club career ==
Born in Bar, SR Montenegro, SFR Yugoslavia, he initially played with FK Hajduk Beograd, and FK Mogren before joining FK Mladost Lučani in 1999, playing back then in the Second League of FR Yugoslavia.

He became a prominent striker at Mladost, and in 2001 they won promotion to the First League of FR Yugoslavia by winning the Group West of the Second League. That season his scoring skills came to maximal expression when by the end of the season, in a league match played on 1 June 2002 against FK Zvezdara, he scored all 6 goals in his team's victory by 6–1. At the end of the season he won the title of league top scorer with 27 goals.

After this successful season, in the following summer he joined the new ambitious team from Belgrade, FK Železnik. Although never repeating the impressive record from the previous season, he became one of the most important players of the Železnik golden generation that brought the club to the top spots in the league during the following seasons. They finished 4th in 2002–03 and 3rd in 2003–04 earning a UEFA Cup spot for the 2004–05 season. During the three seasons he spent with Železnik, he played a total of 78 league matches, having scored 36 goals. His period with Železnik ended up crowned with the conquest of the 2005 Serbia and Montenegro Cup, after a victory over Red Star Belgrade, by 1–0 in the final. After that final, the club struggling with financial problems ended up merged into FK Voždovac, with the squad going through readjustments and with numerous key players moving after several seasons playing together.

After three seasons playing with Železnik, Đurašković signed in summer 2005 with another top flight side, FK Smederevo. Backed by US Steel, the club had just finished 10th in the league, and were aiming to reinforce the team in order to archive the good results they had at the beginning of the decade. The club has been consistently playing in European competitions since 2001, and despite the 10th place Smederevo had granted a spot in the 2005 UEFA Intertoto Cup, what would be a good welcoming for Đurašković. However Smederevo disappointed by losing in their opening round, and they pretty much repeated the same performance in the league that season by finishing 11th. Đurašković failed to have the consistency from the previous seasons, but even so he managed to gather 63 league appearances and scoring 15 goals. In summer 2008, in a reduced 12 teams league, Smederevo finished the season in 10th place, which meant relegation to the Serbian First League.

In the 2008–09 season Đurašković regained his consistency and became one of the key players that helped Smederevo restore its top-flight status, and by finishing in 2nd place, they won promotion to the Serbian SuperLiga. Đurašković scored 9 goals in 25 appearances, however at the end of the season he left Smederevo at age 33 and joined OFK Petrovac in the Montenegrin First League where he will play his last season and finish his playing career

== Honours ==
=== Club ===
Železnik

- Serbia and Montenegro Cup: 2005

Mladost Lučani

- Second League of FR Yugoslavia: 2000–01 (Group West)

=== Individual ===
- First League of FR Yugoslavia top-scorer: 2001–02 (27 goals)
