= Dušan Petković (footballer, born 1903) =

Yugoslavian football player

Personal information
- Date of birth: 13 April 1903
- Place of birth: Belgrade, Kingdom of Serbia
- Date of death: 2 December 1979 (aged 76)
- Place of death: New York City, United States
- Position: Forward

Senior career*
Years	Team	Apps	(Gls)
1922–1926	SK Jugoslavija	11	(14)
1927	SO Montpellier		

International career
1923–1926	Kingdom of Serbs, Croats and Slovenes	8	(2)
- * Club domestic league appearances and goals

Dušan Petković (13 April 1903 – 2 December 1979) was a Serbian and Yugoslav football forward.

== Club career ==
Nicknamed Senegalac (English: The Senegalese) due to somewhat darker complexion, Petković is remembered as a superb striker who had excellent finishing and playmaking abilities. He spent his whole playing career at SK Jugoslavija based in his hometown. He appeared in a total of 175 official games and scored 219 goals for SK Jugoslavija, becoming the second all-time scorer for the club (SK Jugoslavija's top scorer being Dragan Jovanović with 311 goals).

He was part of the squad that won the 1924 and 1925 Yugoslav championships, and in 1926 he was the Yugoslav league top scorer with 8 goals in just 6 appearances. In 1927 he had a short stint playing for Montpellier SC, along with fellow Serb Branislav Sekulić.

== International career ==
Between 1923 and 1926 Petković also played for Yugoslavia national football team. He debuted on 28 October 1923 against Czechoslovakia and scored once in the game which eventually ended in a 4–4 draw. His last game for the national team was on 28 June 1926, also against Czechoslovakia in Zagreb. Petković was part of the squad that represented Yugoslavia at the 1924 Summer Olympics, when the team was knocked out in the first round after taking a 0–7 beating against Uruguay.

After retiring from active football, he worked as a sports editor at the Belgrade daily Vreme until 1941, when he left to Sofia, Bulgaria and worked at Yugoslavia's embassy there. He later moved to the United States and, never returning to Yugoslavia again, died in 1979 in New York City.

== Honours ==
- Yugoslav Championship: 1924, 1925
- Yugoslav Championship top scorer: 1926
