= Vojislav Budimirović =

Serbian footballer

Personal information
- Date of birth: 4 January 1968 (age 58)
- Place of birth: Šabac, SR Serbia, SFR Yugoslavia
- Position: Forward

Senior career*
| Years | Team | Apps | (Gls) |
| 1992–1993 | Mačva Šabac | | |
| 1993–1995 | Lokomotiv Plovdiv | 36 | (17) |
| 1995–1996 | Čukarički | 32 | (23) |
| 1996–1997 | Apollon Limassol | 24 | (12) |
| 1997 | Čukarički | 12 | (2) |
| 1998 | Borac Čačak | 13 | (9) |
| 1998–2000 | Čukarički | 29+ | (6+) |
| 2000–2002 | ZSK Valjevo | | |
| 2002–2003 | Komgrap | | |
| 2003–2005 | Čukarički | 5+ | (0+) |
| Total | | 151+ | (69+) |
- * Club domestic league appearances and goals

Vojislav Budimirović (Serbian Cyrillic: Војислав Будимировић; born 4 January 1968) is a Serbian former professional footballer who played as a forward.

== Career ==
In 1993, Budimirović moved abroad to Bulgaria and signed with Lokomotiv Plovdiv, becoming one of the first Serbians to make an appearance in the A PFG. He spent two seasons with the club, scoring 17 league goals in 36 games.

In 1995, Budimirović returned to FR Yugoslavia to play for Čukarički. He became the First League top scorer in the 1995–96 season with 23 goals.

== Career statistics ==
Appearances and goals by club, season and competition
| Club | Season | League | |
| Club | Season | Apps | Goals |
|---|---|---|---|
| Mačva Šabac | 1992–93 | | |
| Lokomotiv Plovdiv | 1993–94 | 21 | 12 |
| Lokomotiv Plovdiv | 1994–95 | 15 | 5 |
| Lokomotiv Plovdiv | Total | 36 | 17 |
| Čukarički | 1995–96 | 32 | 23 |
| Apollon Limassol | 1996–97 | 24 | 12 |
| Čukarički | 1997–98 | 12 | 2 |
| Borac Čačak | 1997–98 | 13 | 9 |
| Čukarički | 1998–99 | | |
| Čukarički | 1999–2000 | 29 | 6 |
| Čukarički | Total | | |
| ZSK Valjevo | 2000–01 | | |
| ZSK Valjevo | 2001–02 | | |
| ZSK Valjevo | Total | | |
| Komgrap | 2002–03 | | |
| Čukarički | 2003–04 | | |
| Čukarički | 2004–05 | 5 | 0 |
| Čukarički | Total | | |
| Career total | | 127 | 57 |

== Honours ==
- First League of FR Yugoslavia top scorer: 1995–96
