= Dragan Jovanović (footballer) =

Serbian footballer and coach

Personal information
- Date of birth: 29 September 1903
- Place of birth: Belgrade, Kingdom of Serbia
- Date of death: 2 June 1936 (aged 32)
- Place of death: Belgrade, Kingdom of Yugoslavia
- Position: Forward

Senior career*
Years	Team	Apps	(Gls)
1922–1928	SK Jugoslavija	14	(16)

International career
1923–1928	Kingdom of Serbs, Croats and Slovenes	8	(4)

Managerial career
- 1930: SK Jugoslavija
- * Club domestic league appearances and goals

Dragan Jovanović (Serbian Cyrillic: Драган Јовановић; 29 September 1903 – 2 June 1936) was a Serbian and Yugoslav football forward and later manager.

== Club career ==
Jovanović was a right wing forward and is remembered as one of the best strikers in Yugoslav football in the 1920s. He spent his whole playing career at SK Jugoslavija of Belgrade. He appeared in a total of 252 official games and scored 331 goals for the club, becoming the best all-time scorer for the club. He was part of the squad that won the 1924 and 1925 Yugoslav Championships, and in 1923, 1924 and 1925 he was the Yugoslav championship top scorer. He was nicknamed "Žena" and he later became SK Jugoslavija's coach, after the departure of Austrian manager Johann Strnad.

== International career ==
Between 1923 and 1928 Jovanović also played for Yugoslavia national football team. He debuted on 28 October 1923 against Czechoslovakia in Prague and scored 2 goals in the game which eventually ended in a 4–4 draw. His last game for the national team was on 7 October 1928, also against Czechoslovakia, when Yugoslavia took a 1–7 beating.

He retired from football still in his twenties and served as SK Jugoslavija club secretary and the chairman of the club's football section. In 1936 he was killed in a car accident on Nemanjina Street in Belgrade.

== Honours ==
- Yugoslav Championship: 1924, 1925
- Yugoslav Championship top scorer: 1923, 1924, 1925
