= SK Jugoslavija =

- Full name: Sportski klub Jugoslavija
- Nicknames: Crveni (The Reds); Crveno-beli (The Red-Whites); Jugosloveni (The Yugoslavs); Beogradska Jugoslavija (Belgrade's Yugoslavia); S.K.J.
- Short name: Jugoslavija
- Founded: 6 August 1913; 112 years ago as Sportski klub Velika Srbija
- Dissolved: 5 May 1945; 81 years ago
- Ground: Stadion SK Jugoslavija (1927–1945)
- Capacity: 30,000
- League: Serbian Football Championship (1920–1922); Yugoslav League (1923–1940); Serbian League (1941–1944)
Home colours

Sportski klub Jugoslavija (Serbian Cyrillic: Cпортски клуб Југославија), commonly known as Jugoslavija, was a Serbian football club based in Belgrade. It was originally formed as SK Velika Srbija in 1913 and changed its name to SK Jugoslavija in 1919. They were among the most popular Serbian and Yugoslav clubs, and they were nicknamed as "Crveni" (The Reds) because of their red shirts, in opposition to their greatest rivals BSK, who wore blue and were known as "Plavi" (The Blues). Until 1941 the sports society Jugoslavija, beside football, also included sections for athletics, cycling, winter sports, basketball, boxing, wrestling, swimming, and table tennis.

== History ==
The club was founded on August 6, 1913 in the restaurant "Kasino" in Belgrade, by a group of dissidents from another Belgrade football club – BSK. Dissatisfied over a decision to travel to Austria-Hungary in order to play a friendly match with Hajduk Split, this group left BSK and formed their own club, naming it SK Velika Srbija. The leader of the group was Danilo Stojanović, better known as Čika Dača, considered one of the major pioneers of football in the Kingdom of Serbia. Beside a group of former BSK players, the squad was formed by footballers from another Belgrade club, SK Slavija from Belgrade suburb Vračar, a number of players from another club formed by Stojanović, FK Šumadija, and Czech footballers Edvard Mifek, Venčel Petrovický and Alois Machek. The first match was played against BSK, a 2–0 loss. In 1914 they become the champions of the Serbian Olympic Cup which was considered to be the first organised football club competition in the Kingdom. The final was played on May 11 in Košutnjak in the field of BSK in which Velika Srbija defeated Šumadija by 3–1 with two goals from Alois Machek and one from Mileta Jovanović.

With the beginning of the First World War in 1914 the club suspended its activities. It reappeared in 1919 renamed SK Jugoslavija, as the Kingdom of Serbs, Croats and Slovenes (renamed Kingdom of Yugoslavia in 1929) was created a year earlier and colloquially named Jugoslavija from the beginning. The first post-war match was played against a team of British sailors, a 9–0 win, which was the first time the club played with a red kit, which will characterize them from then on and become the main reason for their nickname The Reds (Crveni). Until then, they had been wearing green. That same year the field where the matches were played was reconstructed and an athletic track and a new football and tennis fields were created. That field, named Trkalište, located close to city centre, will be demolished in 1925 when the club moved to a new one, founded in the area of Belgrade known as Topčidersko Brdo, exactly in the area the Red Star Stadium is located now. The new stadium had a capacity of 30,000 spectators, and included an athletics track, a grass pitch, a training field and a club house. It was officially inaugurated on 24 April 1927. In 1932 illumination system was installed. The exhibitional match against Racing Club Paris on June 22, 1932, became the first ever night match to be played in Yugoslavia. In the period between the wars, there were two sports newspapers in Belgrade which also followed the trend marked by the rivalry of the city derby, Sportista, which was close to BSK, and Sport, close to Jugoslavija.

SK Jugoslavija won the Yugoslav Championship in 1924 and 1925, and participated in 14, out of 17, final stages of the Yugoslav Championship. Jugoslavia also won the Yugoslav Cup in 1936.

In 1941 the club changed its name to SK 1913 after the Axis invasion of Yugoslavia. During the years of occupation, the Yugoslav Championship was no longer played, with SK Jugoslavija continuing to compete in the Serbian League, which had been earlier a qualifying league for the final stage of the Yugoslav Championship, but now became the national championship of the German occupied Serbia. The Serbian League as top tier was played from 1941 until 1944 and had three editions, the first of which was won by SK Jugoslavija, and the following two by BSK.

=== Dissolution and establishment of Red Star ===
Prominent clubs throughout Yugoslavia that were considered politically and ideologically incompatible by the new Communist regime were dissolved and remodelled along Soviet sporting lines. In February 1945 the Serbian United Antifascist Youth League commenced the establishment of a new multi-sports society. Toward that end the remaining footballers and sporting facilities of SK Jugoslavija were expropriated by the Communist Party. On 4 March a mass meeting was held in the Belgrade's State Institute for Physical Culture (old DIF), during which a new sports society dubbed "Crvena Zvezda" was proclaimed. The football branch was composed of former "reds" Milovan Ćirić (the first captain of Red Star), Predrag Đajić, Božidar Drenovac, Ljubomir Lovrić, Mladen Kašanin, Mile Kos, Milivoje Đorđević, Dragomir Diklić, Miomir Petrović, Aleksandar Petrović, and Miodrag "Mališa" Petrović amongst others. The new squad was further amalgamated by a substantial contingent of BSK players, which included Svetislav Glišović (serving as the first coach of Red Star), Kosta Tomašević, Rajko Mitić, Branko Stanković, Miodrag Jovanović, Srđan Mrkušić, and Đura Horvatinović. Slobodan Ćosić and Zoran Žujović from Slavija Belgrade were appointed as club directors.

On 5 May 1945, Communist Party Secretary of Sports Mitra Mitrović-Djilas officially signed a decree dissolving all football clubs without formal ties to the regime. Labelled as "bourgeois collaborators", these included most major pre-war clubs who continued playing during the occupation. The new club carried much of SK Jugoslavija's fan base and served as the national team of SR Serbia, winning the first post-war tournament in September 1945, before officially commencing the 1946-47 Yugoslav First League season as Red Star.

The SK Jugoslavija Stadium, colloquially named "Avala" was appropriated and renamed "Red Star Stadium". The club also inherited the red and white colours of Jugoslavija, reviving the now iconic vertical stripe jersey in 1950, as worn by Jugoslavija in season 1943–44. That year the club also adopted a new crest resembling Jugoslavija's shield albeit with a superimposed petokraka.

Although Red Star Belgrade has at times acknowledged its historical links with SK Jugoslavija it does not consider itself a formal successor, unlike, for example OFK Belgrade and Dinamo Zagreb who claim continuity with the respective local pre-war football clubs. By the late 1980s all living former Jugoslavija players were inducted as honorary Crvena Zvezda veterans in an association headed by Rajko Mitić. In 2020 Miodrag "Mališa" Petrović died at the age of 94. He was the last surviving former member of SK Jugoslavija and the last witness to the formation of Crvena Zvezda.

== Name ==
- SK Velika Srbija (Sportski klub Velika Srbija; 1913–1919)
- SK Jugoslavija (Sportski klub Jugoslavija; 1919–1941)
- SK 1913 (Sportski klub 1913; 1941–1945)

== Honours ==
- Yugoslav Championship: 2

1924, 1925

- Serbian League: 1

1941–42

- Yugoslav Cup: 2

1936, 1939

- Serbian Olympic Cup: 1

1914

- Belgrade Football Subassociation: 6

1924, 1924, 1925, 1926, 1928, 1932

== Former players ==
For all former club players with Wikipedia articles, please see: Category:SK Jugoslavija players.

== Historical list of coaches ==
This is an incomplete chronological list of SK Jugoslavija coaches:

- (Bohemia) Alois Machek (1913–1914)
- (Kingdom of Yugoslavia) Danilo Stojanović (1922–1923)
- (Czechoslovakia) Karel Bláha (1923–1926)
- (England) Harry Lank (1927)
- (Kingdom of Yugoslavia) Jovan Ružić (1927)
- (Austria) Johann Strnad (1928–1929)
- (Kingdom of Yugoslavia) Dragan Jovanović (1930)
- (Austria) Johann Strnad (1931)
- (Hungary) Károly Nemes (1933)
- (Kingdom of Yugoslavia) Bane Sekulić (1934)
- (Kingdom of Yugoslavia) Ivan Kumanudi (1935–1936)
- (Kingdom of Yugoslavia) Franjo Giler (1936–1938)
- (Kingdom of Yugoslavia) Božidar Đorđević (1938)
- (Hungary) Gyula Feldmann (1938–1939)
- (Austria) Robert Lang (1939–1940)
- (Kingdom of Yugoslavia) Mira Stevanović (1940–194?)

== See also ==
- Red Star Belgrade
- Yugoslav First League
