= List of OFK Beograd managers =

OFK Beograd is a professional football club based in Karaburma, Belgrade, Serbia.

== Managers ==
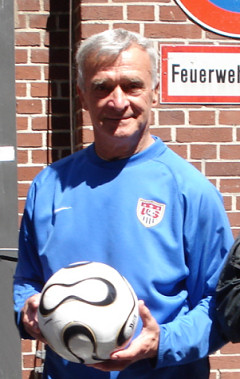
Milutin Šoškić

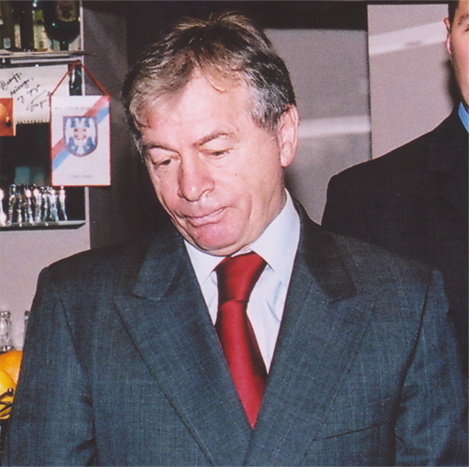
Ilija Petković

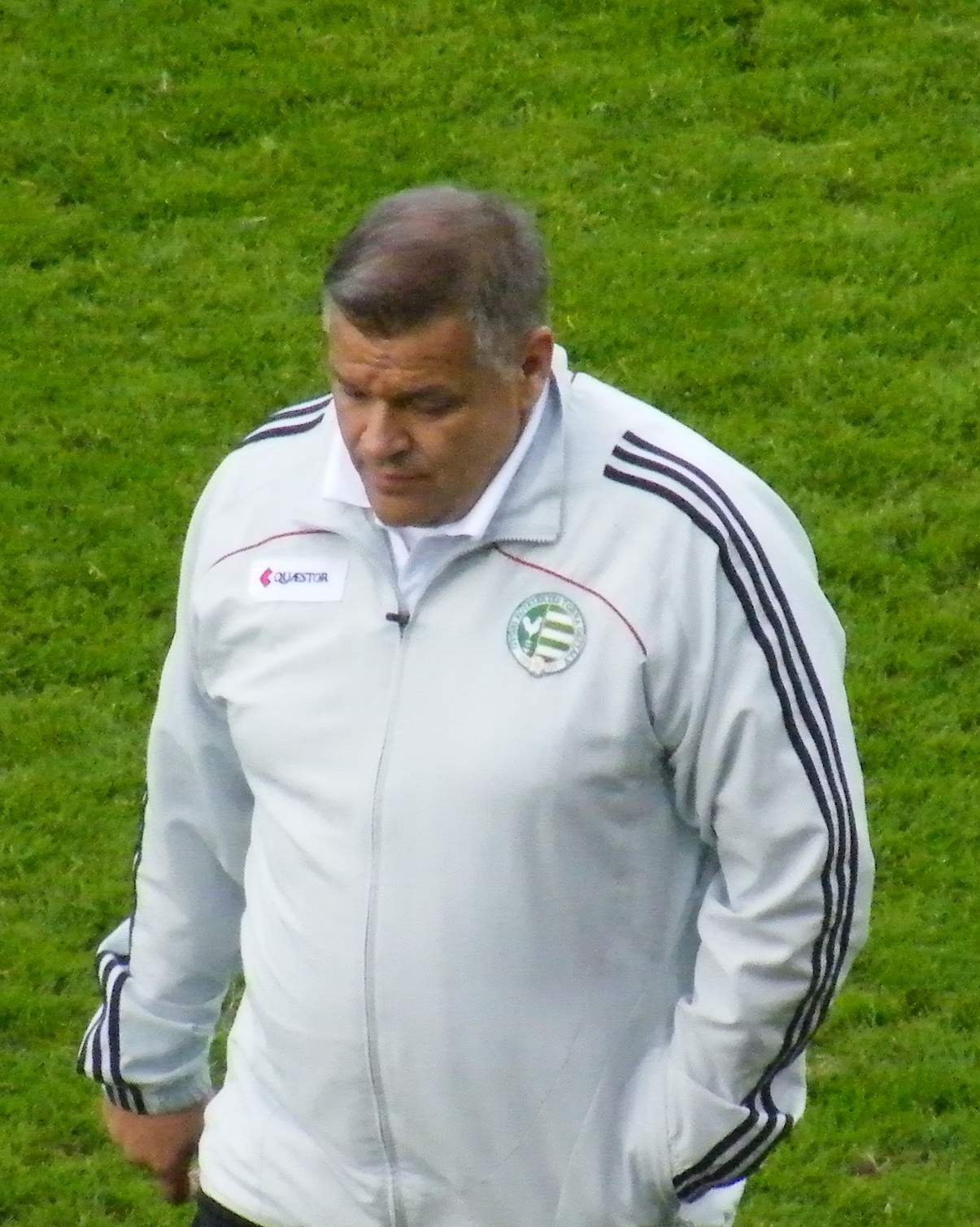
Dragoljub Bekvalac

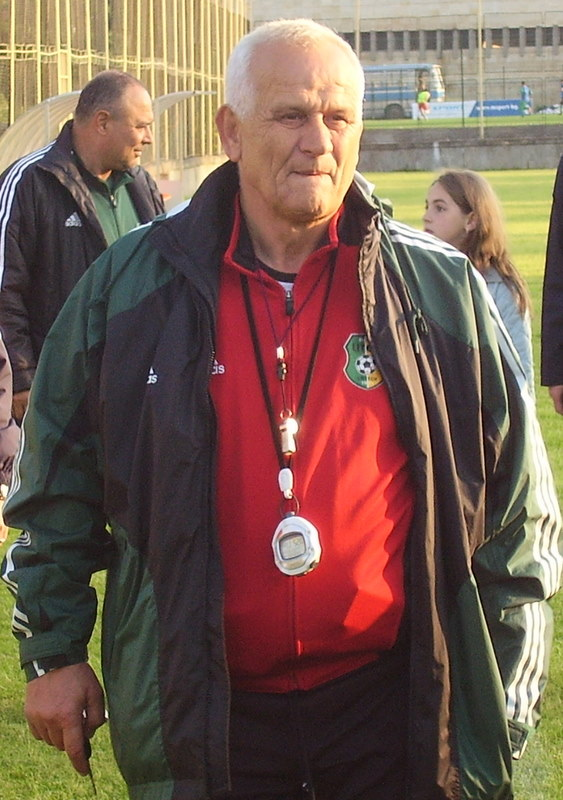
Ljupko Petrović

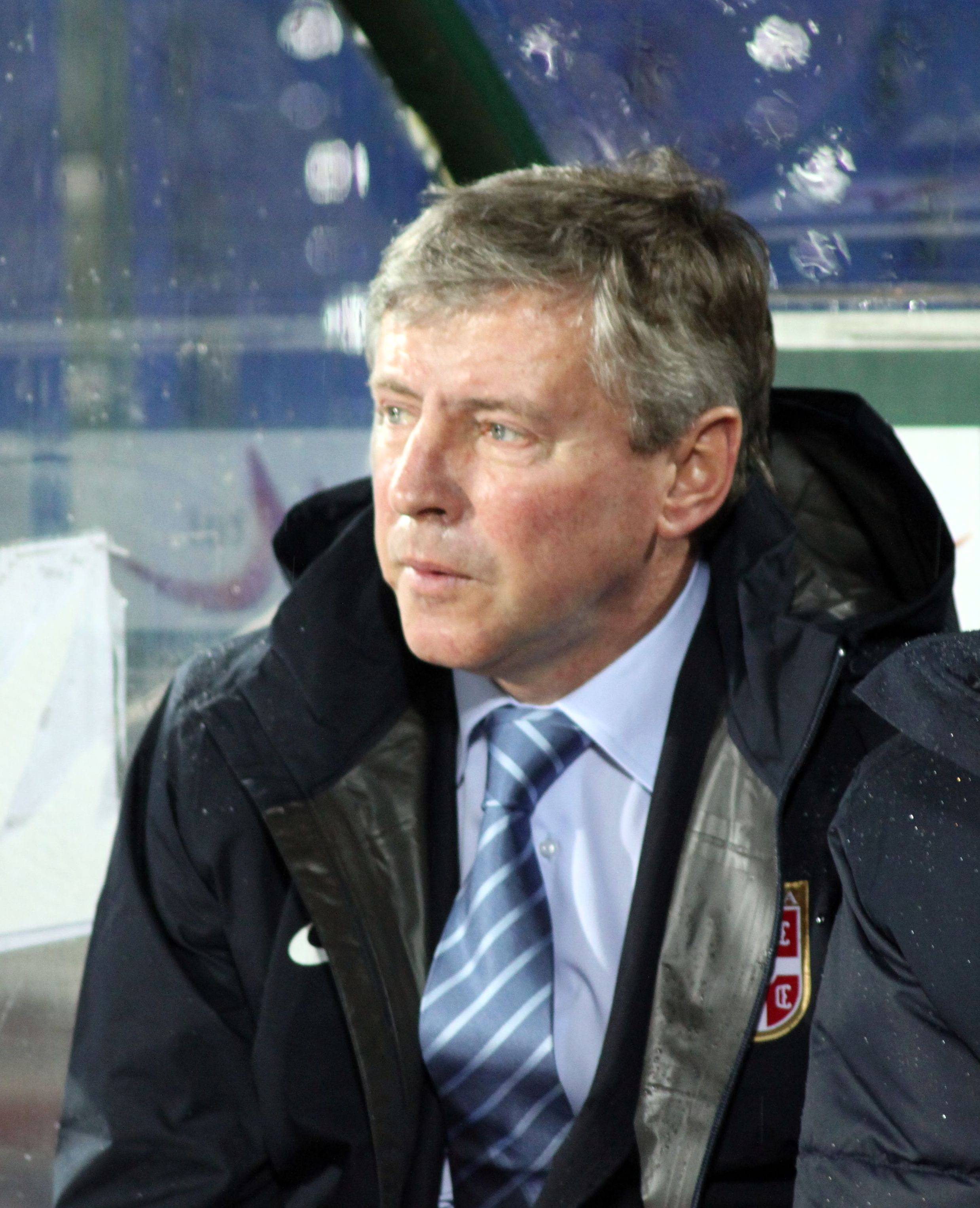
Vladimir Petrović

Name	Period		Pld	W	D	L	Win %	Honours
Name	From	To	Pld	W	D	L	Win %	Honours
(Socialist Federal Republic of Yugoslavia) Milovan Ćirić		1953						
(Socialist Federal Republic of Yugoslavia) Blagoje Marjanović	1953	1956						1953 Yugoslav Cup, 1955 Yugoslav Cup
(Socialist Federal Republic of Yugoslavia) Vojin Božović	1956							
(Socialist Federal Republic of Yugoslavia) Prvoslav Mihajlović								1958–59 Yugoslav Second League (Group East)
(Socialist Federal Republic of Yugoslavia) Đorđe Vujadinović								
(Socialist Federal Republic of Yugoslavia) Milovan Ćirić								1961–62 Yugoslav Cup
(Socialist Federal Republic of Yugoslavia) Mile Kos		December 1963						
(Socialist Federal Republic of Yugoslavia) Sava Antić	December 1963	1964						
(Socialist Federal Republic of Yugoslavia) Milovan Ćirić	1964							
(Socialist Federal Republic of Yugoslavia) Dragiša Milić		1967						1965–66 Yugoslav Cup
(Socialist Federal Republic of Yugoslavia) Žarko Mihajlović	1967	1969						
(Socialist Federal Republic of Yugoslavia) Gojko Zec	1969	1970						
(Socialist Federal Republic of Yugoslavia) Božidar Drenovac	1970	1971						
(Socialist Federal Republic of Yugoslavia) Boris Marović	1971	1973						
(Socialist Federal Republic of Yugoslavia) Milutin Šoškić	1973	1976						
(Socialist Federal Republic of Yugoslavia) Nikola Beogradac	1976	1978						
(Socialist Federal Republic of Yugoslavia) Marko Valok	October 1978	February 1979						
(Socialist Federal Republic of Yugoslavia) Aca Obradović	February 1979	1979						
(Socialist Federal Republic of Yugoslavia) Gojko Zec	January 1980	1983						1979–80 Yugoslav Second League (Group East)
(Socialist Federal Republic of Yugoslavia) Dragutin Spasojević	1983	1984						
(Socialist Federal Republic of Yugoslavia) Velimir Đorđević	1984							1984–85 Yugoslav Second League (Group East)
(Socialist Federal Republic of Yugoslavia) Ilija Petković	May 1988	November 1989						
(Socialist Federal Republic of Yugoslavia) Gojko Zec	November 1989	1990						
(Socialist Federal Republic of Yugoslavia) Milan Živadinović	1990	1991						
(Socialist Federal Republic of Yugoslavia) Ilija Petković	1991	March 1993						
(Federal Republic of Yugoslavia) Blagomir Krivokuća	March 1993	October 1995						
(Federal Republic of Yugoslavia) Krsto Mitrović	October 1995	1996						
(Federal Republic of Yugoslavia) Božidar Milenković	1996	1997						
(Federal Republic of Yugoslavia) Slavko Jović	1997	1997						
(Federal Republic of Yugoslavia) Stojan Vukašinović	1997	1998						
(Federal Republic of Yugoslavia) Đorđe Serpak	1998	1998						
(Federal Republic of Yugoslavia) Miodrag Ješić	1998	1999						
(Federal Republic of Yugoslavia) Zlatko Krmpotić	1999	2000						
(Federal Republic of Yugoslavia) Radmilo Ivančević	2000	June 2000						
(Federal Republic of Yugoslavia) Zvonko Varga	June 2000	November 2001						
(Federal Republic of Yugoslavia) Dragoljub Bekvalac	November 2001	July 2003						
(North Macedonia) Stevica Kuzmanovski	July 2003	April 2004						
(Serbia and Montenegro) Dragoljub Bekvalac	April 2004	May 2004						
(Serbia and Montenegro) Branko Babić	May 2004	October 2005						
(Serbia and Montenegro) Slobodan Krčmarević	October 2005	December 2006						2005–06 Serbia and Montenegro Cup runners-up
(Serbia) Ratko Dostanić	December 2006	April 2007						
(Serbia) Branko Vukašinović	April 2007	March 2008						
(Serbia) Ljupko Petrović	March 2008	April 2008						
(Serbia) Mihailo Ivanović	April 2008	April 2009						
(Bosnia and Herzegovina) Simo Krunić	April 2009	June 2009						
(Serbia) Dejan Đurđević	June 2009	December 2011						
(Serbia) Branko Babić	January 2012	May 2012						
(North Macedonia) Stevica Kuzmanovski	May 2012	September 2012						
(Serbia) Zoran Milinković	September 2012	September 2013						
(Serbia) Zlatko Krmpotić	September 2013	December 2013						
(Serbia) Milan Milanović	December 2013	March 2014						
(Serbia) Zlatko Krmpotić	March 2014	June 2014						
(Serbia) Dejan Đurđević	June 2014	July 2015						
(Serbia) Vladimir Petrović	July 2015	August 2015						
(Serbia) Dragoljub Bekvalac	August 2015	November 2015						
(Serbia) Miodrag Radanović	November 2015	December 2015						
(Montenegro) Dragan Radojičić	December 2015	May 2016						
(Serbia) Slavko Matić	June 2016	August 2016						
(Serbia) Slobodan Kuljanin (caretaker)	September 2016	September 2016						
(Serbia) Dražen Dukić	September 2016	December 2016						
(Serbia) Ljubiša Stamenković	December 2016	April 2017						
(Serbia) Marko Mićović (caretaker)	April 2017	April 2017						
(Serbia) Petar Divić (Note: Divić initially served as a caretaker manager before being appointed on a permanent basis in June 2017.)	April 2017	April 2018						
(Serbia) Đorđe Serpak (caretaker)	April 2018	April 2018						
(Serbia) Dragan Vuković (caretaker)	May 2018	June 2018						
(Serbia) Žarko Todorović	June 2018	October 2018						
(Serbia) Miodrag Anđelković (caretaker)	October 2018	October 2018	1	0	0	1	0.00	
(Serbia) Uroš Kalinić	October 2018	June 2019						
(North Macedonia) Stevica Kuzmanovski	July 2019	October 2019						
(Serbia) Nikola Puača	October 2019	June 2020						
(Serbia) Marko Mićović	August 2020	October 2020						
(Serbia) Miodrag Anđelković	October 2020	December 2021						
(Serbia) Goran Lazarević	December 2021	March 2022						
(North Macedonia) Stevica Kuzmanovski	April 2022	July 2022						
(Serbia) Nenad Grozdić	July 2022	December 2022						
(Bosnia and Herzegovina) Simo Krunić	January 2023	December 2025						2022–23 Serbian League Belgrade, 2023–24 Serbian First League
(Serbia) Jovan Damjanović	January 2026							
