= List of Red Star Belgrade football coaches =

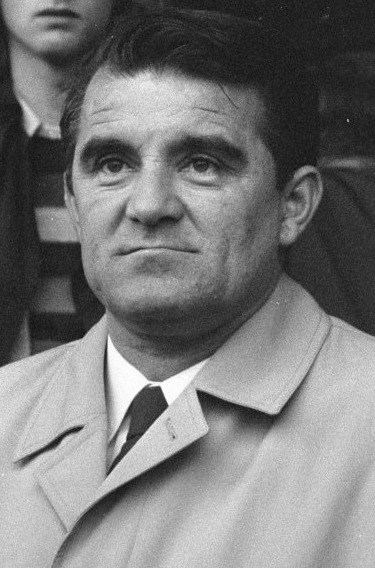
Miljan Miljanić served for eight consecutive seasons as FK Crvena zvezda's head coach, more than any other head coach in club history.

Fudbalski klub Crvena zvezda is a Serbian professional association football club based in Belgrade, Serbia, who currently play in the Serbian SuperLiga. They have played at their current home ground, Red Star Stadium, since 1963.

In Crvena zvezda's history, 43 coaches have coached the club. The first manager was Branislav Sekulić and the current manager is Vladan Milojević, who was appointed on 20 December 2023. Miljan Miljanić had the longest reign as Crvena zvezda coach, with eight consecutive years in charge.

== Managers ==
The following is the list of Red Star Belgrade head coaches and their respective tenures on the bench:

- (Socialist Federal Republic of Yugoslavia) Branislav Sekulić (1946)
- (Socialist Federal Republic of Yugoslavia) Svetislav Glišović (1946–48)
- (Socialist Federal Republic of Yugoslavia) Aleksandar Tomašević (1948–50)
- (Socialist Federal Republic of Yugoslavia) Ljubiša Broćić (1951)
- (Socialist Federal Republic of Yugoslavia) Žarko Mihajlović (1951)
- (Socialist Federal Republic of Yugoslavia) Branislav Sekulić (1952)
- (Socialist Federal Republic of Yugoslavia) Žarko Mihajlović (1952–53)
- (Socialist Federal Republic of Yugoslavia) Ljubiša Broćić (1953–54)
- (Socialist Federal Republic of Yugoslavia) Boško Ralić (1954)
- (Socialist Federal Republic of Yugoslavia) Milovan Ćirić (1954–57)
- (Socialist Federal Republic of Yugoslavia) Milorad Pavić (1957–64)
- (Socialist Federal Republic of Yugoslavia) Ivan Toplak (1964–66)
- (Socialist Federal Republic of Yugoslavia) Miljan Miljanić (1966–74)
- (Socialist Federal Republic of Yugoslavia) Miljenko Mihić (1974–75)
- (Socialist Federal Republic of Yugoslavia) Milovan Ćirić (1975–76)
- (Socialist Federal Republic of Yugoslavia) Gojko Zec (1976–78)
- (Socialist Federal Republic of Yugoslavia) Branko Stanković (1978–82)
- (Socialist Federal Republic of Yugoslavia) Stevan Ostojić (1982–83)
- (Socialist Federal Republic of Yugoslavia) Gojko Zec (1983–86)
- (Socialist Federal Republic of Yugoslavia) Velibor Vasović (1986–88)
- (Socialist Federal Republic of Yugoslavia) Branko Stanković (1988)
- (Socialist Federal Republic of Yugoslavia) Dragoslav Šekularac (1989–90)
- (Socialist Federal Republic of Yugoslavia) Ljupko Petrović (1990–91)
- (Socialist Federal Republic of Yugoslavia) Vladica Popović (1991–92)
- (Serbia and Montenegro) Milan Živadinović (1992–94)
- (Serbia and Montenegro) Ljupko Petrović (1994–96)
- (Serbia and Montenegro) Vladimir Petrović (1996–1997)
- (Serbia and Montenegro) Vojin Lazarević (1997)
- (Serbia and Montenegro) Milorad Kosanović (1997–98)
- (Serbia and Montenegro) Vojin Lazarević (1998–99)
- (Serbia and Montenegro) Miloljub Ostojić (1999)
- (Serbia and Montenegro) Zvonko Radić (caretaker) (1999)
- (Serbia and Montenegro) Slavoljub Muslin (Sept 20, 1999–Sept 30, 2001)
- (Serbia and Montenegro) Zoran Filipović (Oct 5, 2001–June 4, 2003)
- (Serbia and Montenegro) Slavoljub Muslin (June 10, 2003–May 23, 2004)
- (Serbia and Montenegro) Ljupko Petrović (June 8, 2004–Sept 17, 2004)
- (Serbia and Montenegro) Milovan Rajevac (caretaker) (2004)
- (Serbia and Montenegro) Ratko Dostanić (Sept 25, 2004–July 20, 2005)
- (Italy) Walter Zenga (July 29, 2005–May 30, 2006)
- (Bosnia and Herzegovina) (Greece) Dušan Bajević (July 1, 2006–March 10, 2007)
- (North Macedonia) Boško Gjurovski (March 10, 2007–Aug 10, 2007)
- (Serbia) Milorad Kosanović (Aug 10, 2007–Nov 9, 2007)
- (Serbia) Aleksandar Janković (Nov 9, 2007–June 11, 2008)
- (Czech Republic) (Italy) Zdeněk Zeman (June 17, 2008–Sept 6, 2008)
- (North Macedonia) Čedomir Janevski (Sept 10, 2008–May 8, 2009)
- (Serbia) (Cyprus) Siniša Gogić (caretaker) (May 8, 2009–May 30, 2009)
- (Serbia) Vladimir Petrović (June 3, 2009–March 21, 2010)
- (Serbia) Ratko Dostanić (March 21, 2010–Aug 6, 2010)
- (Serbia) Aleksandar Kristić (Aug 7, 2010–Dec 7, 2010)
- (Croatia) Robert Prosinečki (Dec 9, 2010–Aug 20, 2012)
- (Serbia) Aleksandar Janković (Aug 21, 2012–March 18, 2013)
- (Portugal) Ricardo Sá Pinto (March 19, 2013–June 19, 2013)
- (Slovenia) Slaviša Stojanović (June 24, 2013–June 21, 2014)
- (Serbia) Nenad Lalatović (June 23, 2014–May 24, 2015)
- (Montenegro) Miodrag Božović (June 2, 2015–May 7, 2017)
- (North Macedonia) Boško Gjurovski (caretaker) (May 8, 2017–May 27, 2017)
- (Serbia) Vladan Milojević (June 5, 2017–Dec 19, 2019)
- (Serbia) Dejan Stanković (Dec 21, 2019–Aug 26, 2022)
- (Serbia) Miloš Milojević (Aug 26, 2022–June 30, 2023)
- (Israel) Barak Bakhar (July 1, 2023–December 20, 2023)
- (Serbia) Vladan Milojević (December 20, 2023–present)

== Managerial statistics (1966–present) ==
As of 21 November 2026

Coach	Nat	From	To	Record				
Coach	Nat	From	To	G	W	D	L	Win %
Miljan Miljanić	(Socialist Federal Republic of Yugoslavia)	July 1966	July 1974	328	179	78	71	54.57
Miljenko Mihić	(Socialist Federal Republic of Yugoslavia)	July 1974	July 1975	43	20	9	14	46.51
Milovan Ćirić	(Socialist Federal Republic of Yugoslavia)	July 1975	July 1976	40	18	10	12	45.00
Gojko Zec	(Socialist Federal Republic of Yugoslavia)	July 1976	July 1978	81	47	17	17	58.02
Branko Stanković	(Socialist Federal Republic of Yugoslavia)	July 1978	June 1982	184	93	53	38	50.54
Stevan Ostojić	(Socialist Federal Republic of Yugoslavia)	June 1982	June 1983	40	16	11	13	40.00
Gojko Zec	(Socialist Federal Republic of Yugoslavia)	July 1983	July 1986	128	69	28	31	53.91
Velibor Vasović	(Socialist Federal Republic of Yugoslavia)	July 1986	July 1988	93	47	26	20	50.54
Branko Stanković	(Socialist Federal Republic of Yugoslavia)	July 1988	December 1988	26	11	8	7	42.31
Dragoslav Šekularac	(Socialist Federal Republic of Yugoslavia)	December 1988	June 1990	66	47	9	10	71.21
Ljupko Petrović	(Socialist Federal Republic of Yugoslavia)	July 1990	June 1991	53	35	11	7	66.04
Vladica Popović	(Socialist Federal Republic of Yugoslavia)	June 1991	September 1992	60	40	9	11	66.67
Milan Živadinović	(Serbia and Montenegro)	September 1992	June 1994	82	49	18	15	59.76
Ljupko Petrović	(Serbia and Montenegro)	June 1994	April 1996	81	54	16	11	66.67
Vladimir Petrović	(Serbia and Montenegro)	April 1996	March 1997	40	27	8	5	67.50
Vojin Lazarević	(Serbia and Montenegro)	March 1997	June 1997	19	14	2	3	73.68
Milorad Kosanović	(Serbia and Montenegro)	June 1997	December 1998	74	54	9	11	72.97
Vojin Lazarević	(Serbia and Montenegro)	December 1998	July 1999	9	6	2	1	66.67
Miloljub Ostojić	(Serbia and Montenegro)	July 1999	September 1999	7	3	3	1	42.86
Zvonko Radić	(Serbia and Montenegro)	September 1999	September 1999	1	1	0	0	100.00
Slavoljub Muslin	(Serbia and Montenegro)	September 1999	September 2001	102	75	18	9	73.53
Zoran Filipović	(Serbia and Montenegro)	October 2001	June 2003	77	46	20	11	59.74
Slavoljub Muslin	(Serbia and Montenegro)	June 2003	May 2004	41	31	7	3	75.61
Ljupko Petrović	(Serbia and Montenegro)	June 2004	September 2004	8	3	2	3	37.50
Milovan Rajevac	(Serbia and Montenegro)	September 2004	September 2004	2	2	0	0	100.00
Ratko Dostanić	(Serbia and Montenegro)	September 2004	July 2005	30	23	4	3	76.67
Walter Zenga	(Italy)	July 2005	June 2006	43	33	6	4	76.74
Dušan Bajević	(Bosnia and Herzegovina)	June 2006	March 2007	28	18	3	7	64.29
Boško Gjurovski	(North Macedonia)	March 2007	August 2007	17	13	2	2	76.47
Milorad Kosanović	(Serbia)	August 2007	November 2007	17	7	7	3	41.18
Aleksandar Janković	(Serbia)	November 2007	June 2008	24	16	6	2	66.67
Zdeněk Zeman	(Czech Republic)	June 2008	September 2008	5	0	3	2	0.00
Čedomir Janevski	(North Macedonia)	September 2008	May 2009	26	14	6	6	53.85
Siniša Gogić	(Cyprus)	May 2009	June 2009	4	3	1	0	75.00
Vladimir Petrović	(Serbia)	June 2009	March 2010	25	20	1	4	80.00
Ratko Dostanić	(Serbia)	March 2010	August 2010	13	7	2	4	53.85
Aleksandar Kristić	(Serbia)	August 2010	December 2010	17	13	2	2	76.47
Robert Prosinečki	(Croatia)	December 2010	August 2012	62	43	10	9	69.35
Aleksandar Janković	(Serbia)	August 2012	March 2013	23	14	2	7	60.87
Ricardo Sá Pinto	(Portugal)	March 2013	June 2013	11	8	0	3	72.73
Slaviša Stojanović	(Slovenia)	June 2013	June 2014	37	26	5	6	70.27
Nenad Lalatović	(Serbia)	June 2014	May 2015	32	20	7	5	62.50
Miodrag Božović	(Montenegro)	June 2015	May 2017	84	63	11	10	75.00
Boško Gjurovski	(North Macedonia)	May 2017	June 2017	5	3	0	2	60.00
Vladan Milojević	(Serbia)	June 2017	December 2019	149	106	26	17	71.14
Dejan Stanković	(Serbia)	December 2019	August 2022	134	108	17	9	80.60
Miloš Milojević	(Serbia)	August 2022	May 2023	43	31	8	4	72.09
Barak Bakhar	(Israel)	May 2023	December 2023	28	18	2	8	64.29
Vladan Milojević	(Serbia)	December 2023	December 2025	106	80	12	14	75.47
Dejan Stanković	(Serbia)	December 2025	August 2026	32	24	3	5	75.00
Albert Riera	(Spain)	August 2026	Present	19	15	2	2	78.95
Total				2,699	1,714	521	464	63.51

== See also ==
- List of KK Crvena zvezda head coaches
