= List of PAOK FC managers =

== List of managers ==
The complete list of PAOK managers is shown in the following table:

Name	Nat	From	To	G	W	D	L	GF	GA	Win %	Honours	Notes
Konstantinos Andreadis	(Greece)	1926	1931	0	0	0	0	0	0	—		
Rudolf Gassner	(Austria)	1931	1932	0	0	0	0	0	0	—		
Aristotelis Armaris	(Greece)	1932	1933	0	0	0	0	0	0	—		
Nikos Sankionis	(Greece)	1933	1934	0	0	0	0	0	0	—		
—	—	1940	1945	World War II								
Charilaos Papadopoulos	(Greece)	1945	1946	0	0	0	0	0	0	—		
Aristotelis Armaris	(Greece)	1946	1947	0	0	0	0	0	0	—		
Nikolaos Angelakis	(Greece)	1947	1948	0	0	0	0	0	0	—		
Kostas Deligiorgis	(Greece)	1948	1949	0	0	0	0	0	0	—		
Nikos Pangalos	(Greece)	1949	1950	0	0	0	0	0	0	—		^{[A]}
Wilhelm Sevcik	(Austria)	1950	1952	0	0	0	0	0	0	—		
Nikos Pangalos	(Greece)	1952	1953	0	0	0	0	0	0	—		^{[A]}
Ermao Hoffman	(Hungary)	1955	1956	0	0	0	0	0	0	—		
Niko Polti	(Austria)	1956	1957	0	0	0	0	0	0	—		
Kleanthis Vikelidis	(Greece)	1957	1957	0	0	0	0	0	0	—		
Walter Pfeiffer	(Austria)	1957	1957	0	0	0	0	0	0	—		
Kostas Zogas	(Greece)	1957	1958	0	0	0	0	0	0	—		
Dionysis Minardos	(Greece)	1958	1959	0	0	0	0	0	0	—		
National Division (Alpha Ethniki)
Žarko Mihajlović	(Serbia)	1959	1961	71	25	25	21	107	74	35.21		^{[F]}
Karl Durspekt	(Austria)	1961	1963	72	32	18	22	104	86	44.44		
György Babolcsay	(Hungary)	1963	1965	64	21	17	26	56	71	32.81		
Mile Kos	(Serbia)	1965	04.1966	22	8	6	8	30	36	36.36		
Lefteris Papadakis (c)	(Greece)	04.1966	06.1966	11	3	4	4	15	20	27.27		^{[A]}
Nikos Pangalos	(Greece)	1966	11.1967	38	16	12	10	48	33	42.11		^{[A]}
Dimitris Kalogiannis (c)	(Greece)	11.1967	02.1968	16	8	2	6	32	22	50.00		^{[A]}
Ivor Powell	(Wales)	02.1968	07.1968	19	8	5	6	31	13	42.11		
Jane Janevski	(Serbia)	1968	1969	37	18	10	9	71	44	48.65		
Jenő Csaknády	(Hungary)	1969	1970	39	16	17	6	63	27	41.03		
Ivica Horvat	(Croatia)	1970	01.1971	16	6	4	6	18	18	37.50		
Giorgos Chasiotis (c)	(Greece)	01.1971	02.1971	5	1	2	2	1	4	20.00		^{[A]}
Les Shannon	(England)	02.1971	10.1974	152	90	35	27	291	137	59.21	2 Greek Cups	^{[B]}
Apostolos Progios (c)	(Greece)	10.1974	12.1974	8	6	2	0	25	6	75.00		^{[A]}
Gyula Lóránt	(Hungary)	12.1974	1976	63	40	14	9	119	46	63.49	1 Greek Championship	
Branko Stanković	(Bosnia and Herzegovina)	1976	05.04.1977	33	22	7	4	66	32	66.67		
Billy Bingham	(England)	1977	11.1977	20	9	6	5	25	16	45.00		
Dimitris Kalogiannis (c)	(Greece)	11.1977	12.1977	10	5	5	0	16	5	50.00		^{[A]}
Lakis Petropoulos	(Greece)	12.1977	05.1978	24	14	7	3	43	18	58.33		
Egon Piechaczek	(Poland)	09.1978	27.04.1980	73	39	16	18	139	62	53.42		
Gyula Lóránt	(Hungary)	28.04.1980	31.05.1981	44	21	14	9	67	38	47.73		^{[E]}
Aristos Fountoukidis (c)	(Greece)	01.06.1981	21.06.1981	5	3	1	1	9	6	60.00		^{[A]}
Heinz Höher	(Germany)	06.09.1981	26.06.1983	91	52	17	22	151	69	57.14		
Pál Csernai	(Hungary)	04.09.1983	06.05.1984	41	16	18	7	50	38	39.02		
Walter Skocik	(Austria)	23.09.1984	02.03.1986	66	32	15	19	111	74	48.48	1 Greek Championship	
Michalis Bellis	(Greece)	03.03.1986	15.05.1986	8	4	2	2	11	8	50.00		^{[A]}
Thijs Libregts	(Netherlands)	07.09.1986	06.12.1987	44	21	13	10	65	38	47.73		
Michalis Bellis	(Greece)	07.12.1987	15.05.1988	22	13	3	6	41	19	59.09		^{[A]}
Rinus Israël	(Netherlands)	11.09.1988	22.01.1989	24	12	5	7	37	23	50.00		
Nikos Alefantos	(Greece)	23.01.1989	09.04.1989	13	4	5	4	11	11	30.77		
Stavros Sarafis (c)	(Greece)	10.04.1989	21.05.1989	3	0	2	1	2	5	0.00		^{[A]}
Rob Jacobs	(Netherlands)	17.09.1989	23.12.1990	60	32	14	14	86	50	53.33		
Christos Terzanidis	(Greece)	24.12.1990	02.06.1991	29	14	7	8	46	29	48.28		^{[A]}
Ćiro Blažević	(Croatia)	01.09.1991	22.03.1992	38	17	13	8	56	44	44.74		
Giannis Gounaris	(Greece)	23.03.1992	07.06.1992	14	4	4	6	18	19	28.57		^{[A]}
Ljupko Petrović	(Serbia)	06.09.1992	24.01.1993	26	10	6	10	42	33	38.46		
Nikos Zalikas (c)	(Greece)	25.01.1993	30.01.1993	1	1	0	0	2	1	100.00		
Oleg Blokhin	(Ukraine)	07.02.1993	27.02.1994	48	22	16	10	70	51	45.83		
Stavros Sarafis (c)	(Greece)	28.02.1994	28.04.1994	8	3	1	4	8	9	37.50		^{[A]}
Arie Haan	(Netherlands)	24.08.1994	01.10.1995	45	26	9	10	73	37	57.78		
Stavros Sarafis (c)	(Greece)	02.10.1995	26.11.1995	9	4	3	2	15	8	44.44		^{[A]}
Dragan Kokotovic	(Serbia)	27.11.1995	04.02.1996	13	6	2	5	23	15	46.15		
Michalis Bellis	(Greece)	05.02.1996	05.05.1996	14	5	4	5	15	18	35.71		^{[A]}
Gunder Bengtsson	(Sweden)	06.05.1996	01.12.1996	17	7	5	5	24	21	41.18		
Christos Archontidis	(Greece)	02.12.1996	02.02.1997	10	3	4	3	10	9	30.00		
Angelos Anastasiadis	(Greece)	03.02.1997	17.05.1998	63	41	11	11	135	70	65.08		^{[A]}^{[C]}
Oleg Blokhin	(Ukraine)	11.08.1998	29.08.1998	4	0	1	3	1	7	0.00		
Angelos Anastasiadis	(Greece)	30.08.1998	07.02.1999	19	13	3	3	34	14	68.42		^{[A]}^{[C]}
Arie Haan	(Netherlands)	08.02.1999	28.11.1999	34	19	5	10	66	32	55.88		
Stavros Sarafis (c)	(Greece)	29.11.1999	29.12.1999	4	3	0	1	8	3	75.00		^{[A]}
Dušan Bajević	(Bosnia and Herzegovina)	01.01.2000	08.05.2002	117	63	28	26	259	168	53.85	1 Greek Cup	
Angelos Anastasiadis	(Greece)	25.08.2002	26.09.2004	94	48	23	23	145	93	51.06	1 Greek Cup	^{[A]}^{[C]}
Rolf Fringer	(Austria)	27.09.2004	13.02.2005	19	6	5	8	23	26	31.58		
Nikos Karageorgiou	(Greece)	17.02.2005	16.09.2005	15	6	5	4	23	19	40.00		^{[A]}
Giorgos Kostikos	(Greece)	17.09.2005	20.02.2006	24	9	7	8	36	25	37.50		^{[A]}
Ilie Dumitrescu	(Romania)	21.02.2006	03.10.2006	16	7	3	6	21	17	43.75		
Stavros Sarafis (c)	(Greece)	03.10.2006	12.10.2006	0	0	0	0	0	0	—		^{[A]}
Momčilo Vukotić	(Serbia)	13.10.2006	22.01.2007	15	8	2	5	17	12	53.33		
Georgios Paraschos	(Greece)	22.01.2007	02.09.2007	14	6	2	6	14	16	42.86		^{[A]}
Fernando Santos	(Portugal)	03.09.2007	19.05.2010	114	58	24	32	132	92	50.88		
Mario Beretta	(Italy)	14.06.2010	22.07.2010	0	0	0	0	0	0	—		^{[D]}
Pavlos Dermitzakis	(Greece)	23.07.2010	17.10.2010	12	3	6	3	12	12	25.00		^{[A]}
Makis Chavos	(Greece)	18.10.2010	25.05.2011	42	22	8	12	48	38	52.38		^{[A]}
László Bölöni	(Romania)	09.06.2011	20.05.2012	51	24	14	13	72	45	47.06		
Georgios Donis	(Greece)	02.06.2012	29.04.2013	42	26	9	7	69	31	61.90		
Georgios Georgiadis (c)	(Greece)	30.04.2013	02.06.2013	6	3	0	3	7	7	50.00		^{[A]}
Huub Stevens	(Netherlands)	25.06.2013	02.03.2014	45	26	9	10	84	45	57.78		
Giorgos Georgiadis (c)	(Greece)	03.03.2014	17.05.2014	16	8	4	4	25	20	50.00		^{[A]}
Angelos Anastasiadis	(Greece)	11.06.2014	16.03.2015	38	19	6	13	65	47	50.00		^{[A]}^{[C]}
Giorgos Georgiadis (c)	(Greece)	16.03.2015	30.06.2015	13	4	4	5	8	11	30.77		^{[A]}
Igor Tudor	(Croatia)	01.07.2015	09.03.2016	44	17	17	10	68	42	38.64		
Vladimir Ivic	(Serbia)	09.03.2016	09.06.2017	70	41	12	17	114	52	58.57	1 Greek Cup	^{[A]}
Aleksandar Stanojević	(Serbia)	16.06.2017	11.08.2017	2	1	1	0	3	1	50.00		
Răzvan Lucescu	(Romania)	11.08.2017	01.07.2019	93	69	12	12	195	64	74.19	1 Greek Championship, 2 Greek Cups	
Abel Ferreira	(Portugal)	01.07.2019	31.10.2020	57	31	16	10	92	51	54.39		
Pablo García	(Uruguay)	31.10.2020	26.05.2021	42	23	9	10	79	44	54.76	1 Greek Cup	^{[A]}
Răzvan Lucescu	(Romania)	26.05.2021	19.05.2026	207	115	42	50	378	204	55.56	1 Greek Championship	
Alessio Lisci	(Italy)	19.05.2026	Present	0	0	0	0	0	0	—		

As of 23 February 2025

== Notes ==
A. ^{a} ^{(a2} ^{a3)} ^{b} ^{c} ^{(c2)} ^{d} ^{e} ^{f} ^{g} ^{(g2} ^{g3)} ^{h} ^{(h2} ^{h3} ^{h4} ^{h5)} ^{i} ^{j} ^{k} ^{(k2} ^{k3} ^{k4)} ^{l} ^{m} ^{n} ^{o} ^{p} ^{q} ^{(q2} ^{q3)} ^{r} Formerly played for the club

B. Les Shannon is the longest-serving manager (3 years an 8 months).

C. Angelos Anastasiadis is the overall longest serving manager (4 years and 2 months), in four distinct terms. Also has the most games in four distinct terms (211).

D. Mario Beretta is the shortest-serving manager (38 days).

E. On 31 May 1981, while still working as coach (Gyula Lóránt), he suffered a heart attack, watching PAOK play Olympiacos and died at the game, aged 58.

F. The 1st National Division (Alpha Ethniki) was established in 1959-60. PAOK had the Žarko Mihajlović as head coach.

(c) = Caretaker manager
