= List of FK Čukarički managers =

FK Čukarički is a professional football club based in Čukarica, Belgrade, Serbia.

== Managers ==
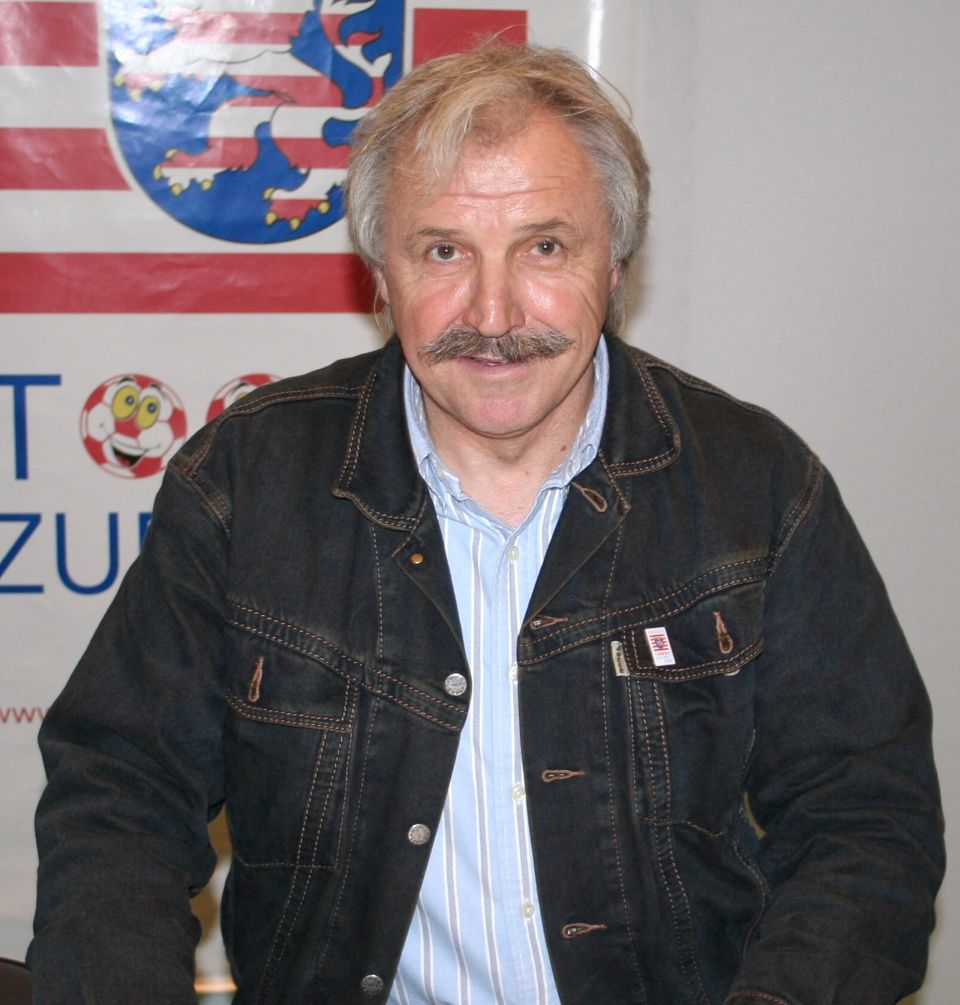
Dragoslav Stepanović

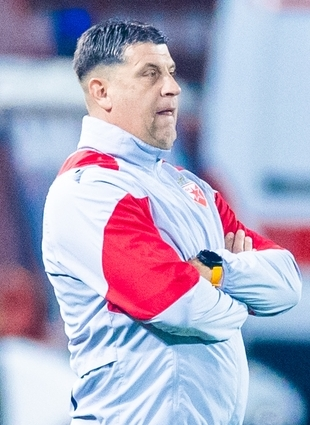
Vladan Milojević

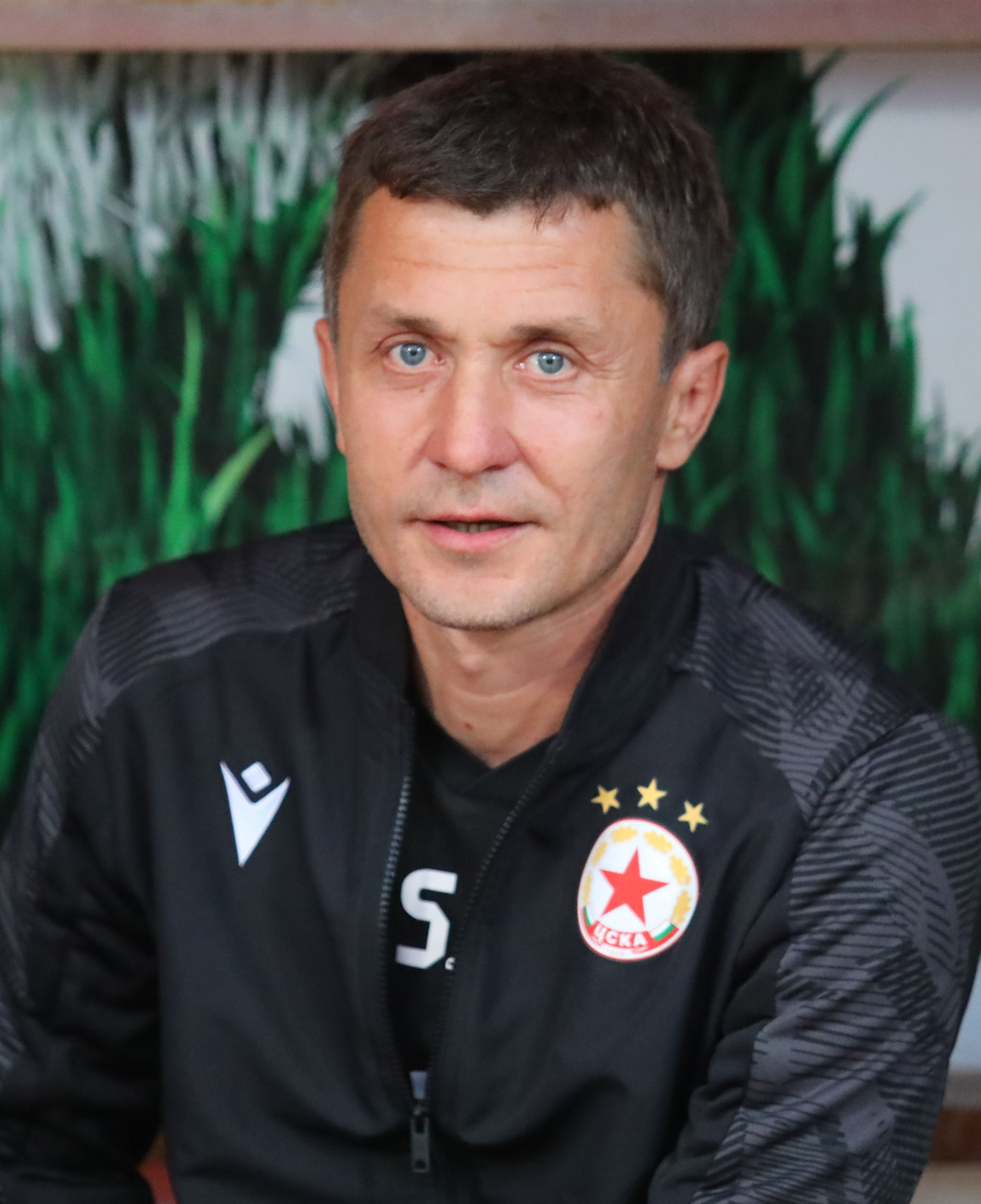
Saša Ilić

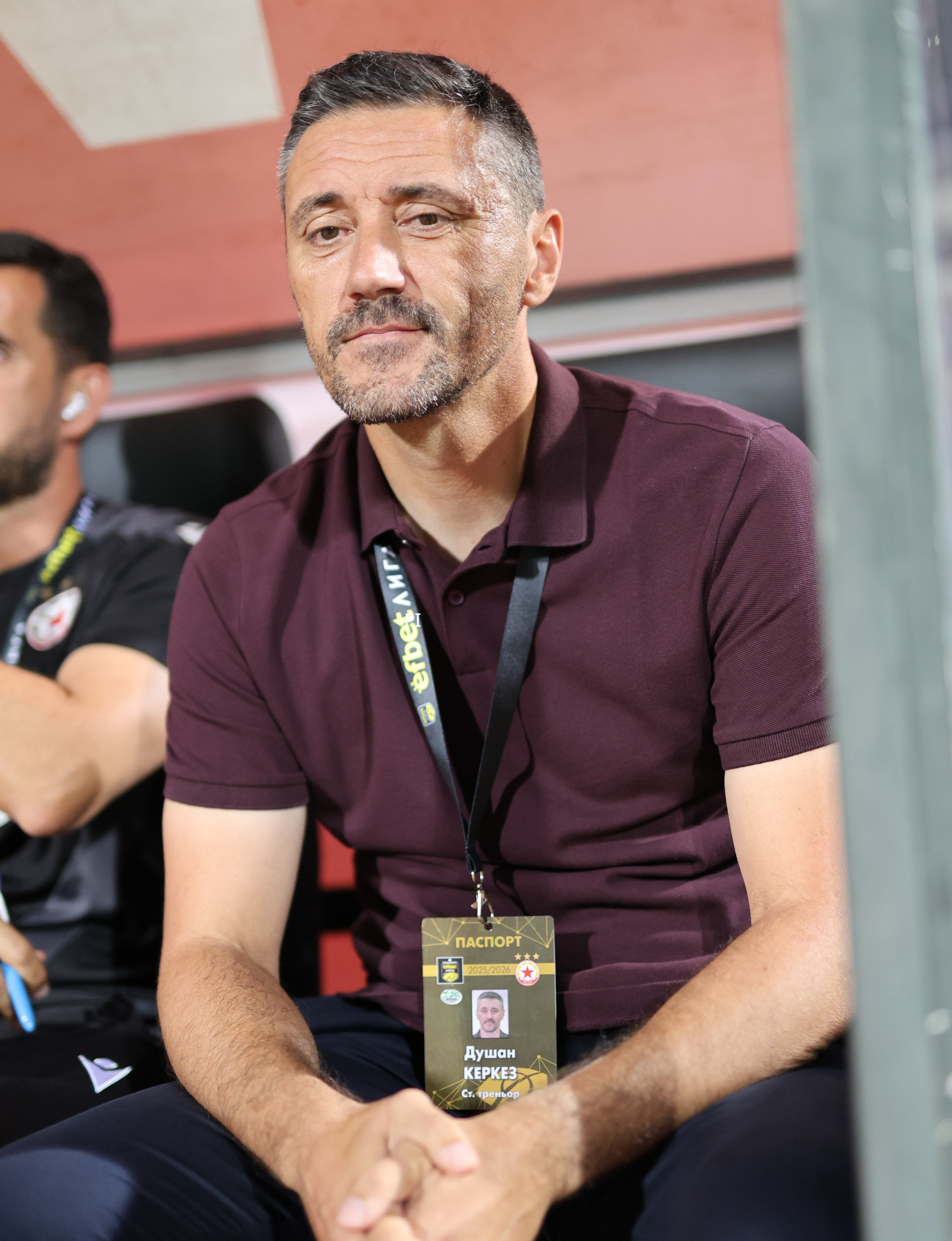
Dušan Kerkez

Name	Period		Pld	W	D	L	Win %	Honours
Name	From	To	Pld	W	D	L	Win %	Honours
(Federal Republic of Yugoslavia) Dragutin Spasojević		1993						1992–93 Serbian League North
(Federal Republic of Yugoslavia) Timotije Davidović	1993	May 1996						
(Federal Republic of Yugoslavia) Miroslav Pavlović (caretaker)	May 1996	May 1996						
(Federal Republic of Yugoslavia) Dragan Okuka	June 1996	November 1997						
(Federal Republic of Yugoslavia) Zvonko Radić	November 1997	1998						
(Federal Republic of Yugoslavia) Milenko Kiković	1998	1999						
(Federal Republic of Yugoslavia) Borislav Raduka	1999	2000						
(Federal Republic of Yugoslavia) Nikola Marjanović	2000							
(Federal Republic of Yugoslavia) Miloljub Ostojić		2001						
(Federal Republic of Yugoslavia) Goran Stevanović	June 2001	2001						
(Federal Republic of Yugoslavia) Borislav Raduka	2001	2001						
(Federal Republic of Yugoslavia) Miroslav Vukašinović	October 2001	December 2002						
(Serbia and Montenegro) Željko Simović (Note: Simović initially served as a caretaker manager before being appointed on a permanent basis in January 2003.)	December 2002	May 2003						
(Serbia and Montenegro) Borislav Raduka (caretaker)	May 2003	2003						
(Serbia and Montenegro) Branko Babić	July 2003	2004						
(Serbia and Montenegro) Mihailo Ivanović	2004	June 2004						2003–04 Second League of Serbia and Montenegro (Group West)
(Serbia and Montenegro) Nikola Rakojević	June 2004	April 2005						
(Serbia and Montenegro) Borislav Raduka (Note: Raduka initially served as a caretaker manager before being appointed on a permanent basis in June 2005.)	April 2005	September 2005						
(Serbia and Montenegro) Zoran Popović	2005	June 2006						
(Serbia) Branko Babić	June 2006	August 2007						
(Serbia) Vladan Milojević (caretaker)	August 2007	August 2007						
(Serbia) Dragoslav Stepanović	August 2007	December 2008						
(Montenegro) Srđan Golović (caretaker)	December 2008	December 2008						
(Serbia) Dejan Đurđević	December 2008	June 2009						
(Serbia) Miloljub Ostojić	July 2009	August 2009						
(Serbia) Srđan Vasiljević	August 2009	January 2010						
(Bosnia and Herzegovina) Simo Krunić	February 2010	August 2010						
(Serbia) Aleksandar Jović	August 2010	November 2010						
(Serbia) Vladimir Romčević (caretaker)	November 2010	January 2011						
(Serbia) Dragan Lacmanović	January 2011	2011						
(Serbia) Borislav Raduka	2011	February 2012						
(Serbia) Vladan Milojević	February 2012	October 2015						2014–15 Serbian Cup
(Serbia) Zoran Popović	October 2015	March 2016						
(Serbia) Milan Lešnjak	March 2016	September 2016						
(Serbia) Nenad Mirosavljević (caretaker)	September 2016	September 2016						
(Serbia) Gordan Petrić	September 2016	December 2016						
(Serbia) Nenad Lalatović	December 2016	May 2018						
(Serbia) Nenad Mirosavljević (caretaker)	May 2018	May 2018						
(Bosnia and Herzegovina) Simo Krunić	May 2018	May 2019						
(Serbia) Aleksandar Veselinović	May 2019	September 2020						
(Serbia) Dušan Đorđević	September 2020	August 2021						
(Serbia) Saša Ilić	August 2021	April 2022						
(Serbia) Milan Lešnjak	April 2022	May 2022						
(Bosnia and Herzegovina) Dušan Kerkez	May 2022	August 2023						2022–23 Serbian Cup runners-up
(Serbia) Igor Matić	August 2023	December 2023						
(Serbia) Gordan Petrić	January 2024	March 2024						
(Serbia) Goran Stanić (Note: Stanić initially served as a caretaker manager before being appointed on a permanent basis in April 2024.)	March 2024	November 2024						
(Serbia) Marko Savić	December 2024	April 2025						
(Serbia) Milan Lešnjak	April 2025							
