= Bekvalac =

Bekvalac is a surname of Serbian origin. Notable people with the surname include:

- Dragoljub Bekvalac (born 1952), Serbian footballer and manager
- Nataša Bekvalac (born 1980), Serbian singer
