= Srđan Čebinac =

Yugoslav footballer

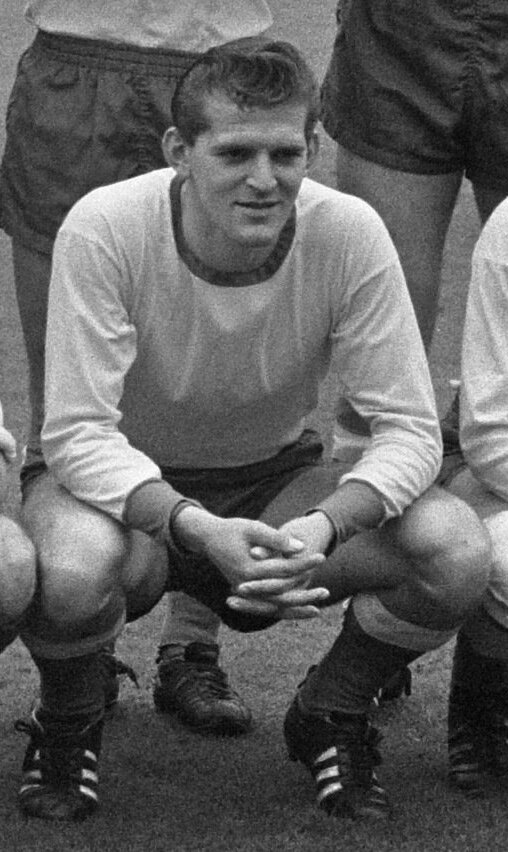
- Čebinac lining up for Sittardia in 1966

Personal information
- Date of birth: 8 December 1939 (age 86)
- Place of birth: Belgrade, Kingdom of Yugoslavia
- Position: Forward

Youth career
- 1954–1957: Partizan

Senior career*
Years	Team	Apps	(Gls)
1957–1961	Partizan	15	(6)
1961–1964	OFK Beograd	50	(24)
1965–1966	1. FC Köln	3	(1)
1966–1968	Sittardia	58	(13)
1968–1969	Austria Wien	9	(2)
1970–1971	Rijeka	31	(5)
1972	Fortuna SC	9	(1)
1972–1975	Aarau		
1976–1980	Nordstern Basel		

International career
1964	Yugoslavia	1	(0)

Managerial career
- 1973–1975: Aarau (player-manager)
- * Club domestic league appearances and goals

Srđan Čebinac (Serbian Cyrillic: Срђан Чебинац; born 8 December 1939) is a Yugoslav former footballer who played as a forward.

== Club career ==
Born in Belgrade, Čebinac came through the youth system of Partizan, making his competitive debut in the second part of the 1956–57 Yugoslav First League. He was sidelined during the title-winning 1960–61 season due to a dispute with the club's board. Subsequently, Čebinac joined OFK Beograd, spending three seasons with the side. He helped them win the Yugoslav Cup in 1961–62. Following the expiration of his contract, Čebinac took a one-year break from football in order to be able to play abroad.

In 1965, Čebinac went for a trial with 1. FC Köln on the recommendation of Zlatko Čajkovski. He eventually signed for the club, but suffered an ankle injury early on in the season, appearing in just three games in the 1965–66 Bundesliga. In 1966, Čebinac moved to the Netherlands and agreed to a three-year contract with Eredivisie newcomers Sittardia. He recorded 58 appearances and scored 13 goals in the top flight of Dutch football over two seasons. Subsequently, Čebinac was transferred to Austria Wien, winning the 1968–69 league title.

In early 1970, Čebinac made a return to his homeland and spent two calendar years with Rijeka in the Yugoslav Second League. He then moved back to the Netherlands for a brief spell at Fortuna SC in the first half of 1972. Later that year, Čebinac joined Swiss club Aarau, later serving as their player-manager.

== International career ==
At international level, Čebinac was capped once for Yugoslavia on 18 March 1964, playing the full 90 minutes in an away friendly against Bulgaria that ended in a 1–0 win.

== Personal life ==
Čebinac also holds Swiss citizenship. He is the twin brother of fellow footballer Zvezdan Čebinac.

== Honours ==
OFK Beograd

- Yugoslav Cup: 1961–62

Austria Wien

- Austrian Championship: 1968–69

Rijeka

- Yugoslav Second League: 1970–71 (Group West)
