= 1961–62 Yugoslav Cup =

1962 Yugoslav Football Cup
15th Marshal Tito Cup

Tournament details
- Country: Yugoslavia
- Dates: 11 February – 4 July
- Teams: 32

Final positions
- Champions: OFK Beograd (3rd title)
- Runners-up: Spartak Subotica
- Cup Winners' Cup: OFK Beograd

Tournament statistics
- Matches played: 31
- Goals scored in penalty shoot-outs not included.

The 1961–62 Yugoslav Cup was the 15th season of the top football knockout competition in SFR Yugoslavia, the Yugoslav Cup (Serbo-Croatian: Kup Jugoslavije), also known as the "Marshal Tito Cup" (Kup Maršala Tita), since its establishment in 1947.

== First round ==
In the following tables winning teams are marked in bold; teams from outside top level are marked in italic script.

Tie no	Home team	Score	Away team
1	**Bačka Bačka Palanka**	3–1	**Borac Banja Luka**
2	**Budućnost Titograd**	3–1	Željezničar Sarajevo
3	Čelik Nikšić	2–4	**Radnički Sombor**
4	Čelik Zenica	0–1	**Sarajevo**
5	**Maribor**	2–2 (11–10 p)	Lokomotiva Zagreb
6	**Novi Sad**	2–1	Vojvodina
7	Pelister Bitola	1–4	**Dinamo Zagreb**
8	Rudar Kakanj	0–3	**OFK Belgrade**
9	**Sloboda Tuzla**	1–0	Partizan
10	**Spartak Subotica**	2–1	Trešnjevka
11	**RNK Split**	2–0	Radnički Niš
12	Srem	0–1	**Hajduk Split**
13	Sutjeska Nikšić	0–2	**Rijeka**
14	Vardar	1–2	**Red Star**
15	**Varteks**	2–0	Dinamo Zagreb II
16	**Velež**	3–1	Radnički Belgrade

== Second round ==
Tie no	Home team	Score	Away team
1	Bačka Bačka Palanka	1–2	**Sloboda Tuzla**
2	**Dinamo Zagreb**	3–0	RNK Split
3	**OFK Belgrade**	1–0	Budućnost Titograd
4	**Radnički Sombor**	1–0	Hajduk Split
5	**Red Star**	5–1	Maribor
6	Rijeka	1–2	**Velež**
7	**Sarajevo**	2–0	Novi Sad
8	Varteks	0–2	**Spartak Subotica**

== Quarter-finals ==
Tie no	Home team	Score	Away team
1	**Dinamo Zagreb**	1–0	Sarajevo
2	**Red Star**	2–1	Radnički Sombor
3	**Spartak Subotica**	1–0	Sloboda Tuzla
4	Velež	0–1	**OFK Belgrade**

== Semi-finals ==
Tie no	Home team	Score	Away team
1	**OFK Belgrade**	2–1	Dinamo Zagreb
2	**Spartak Subotica**	4–3 (a.e.t.)	Red Star

== Final ==
4 July 1962

OFK Beograd	4–1	Spartak Subotica
Antić 5', 15'; Čebinac 56'; Samardžić 76'		Đukanović 49'

Stadion JNA, Belgrade
Attendance: 10,000
Referee: Vinko Kapusta (Zagreb)

OFK BEOGRAD:
GK	1	(Socialist Federal Republic of Yugoslavia) Srboljub Krivokuća
DF	2	(Socialist Federal Republic of Yugoslavia) Miroslav Milovanović
DF	3	(Socialist Federal Republic of Yugoslavia) Momčilo Gavrić
DF	4	(Socialist Federal Republic of Yugoslavia) Milorad Popov
DF	5	(Socialist Federal Republic of Yugoslavia) Vasilije Šijaković
MF	6	(Socialist Federal Republic of Yugoslavia) Zoran Dakić
FW	7	(Socialist Federal Republic of Yugoslavia) Spasoje Samardžić
MF	8	(Socialist Federal Republic of Yugoslavia) Srđan Čebinac
FW	9	(Socialist Federal Republic of Yugoslavia) Sava Antić
MF	10	(Socialist Federal Republic of Yugoslavia) Sreten Banović
FW	11	(Socialist Federal Republic of Yugoslavia) Josip Skoblar
Manager:
(Socialist Federal Republic of Yugoslavia) Milovan Ćirić

SPARTAK SUBOTICA:
GK	1	(Socialist Federal Republic of Yugoslavia) Tomislav Taušan
DF	2	(Socialist Federal Republic of Yugoslavia) Mihalj Bleskanj
DF	3	(Socialist Federal Republic of Yugoslavia) Stevan Ćopić
DF	4	(Socialist Federal Republic of Yugoslavia) Ladislav Jenovai
DF	5	(Socialist Federal Republic of Yugoslavia) Petar Ušumović
	6	(Socialist Federal Republic of Yugoslavia) Jožef Agošton
	7	(Socialist Federal Republic of Yugoslavia) Josip Takač
	8	(Socialist Federal Republic of Yugoslavia) Laslo Borbelj
	9	(Socialist Federal Republic of Yugoslavia) Matija Hiršman
	10	(Socialist Federal Republic of Yugoslavia) Milorad Đukanović
	11	(Socialist Federal Republic of Yugoslavia) Bela Milodanović
Manager:
(Socialist Federal Republic of Yugoslavia) Lajoš Jakovetić

== See also ==
- 1961–62 Yugoslav First League
- 1961–62 Yugoslav Second League
