= Marko Mićović =

Serbian football manager (born 1974)

Personal information
- Full name: Marko Mićović
- Date of birth: 14 October 1974 (age 52)
- Place of birth: Belgrade, SFR Yugoslavia

Managerial career
- Years: Team
- 2017: OFK Beograd (caretaker)
- 2017–2019: Balzan
- 2019: Mačva Šabac (caretaker)
- 2019–2020: Rad
- 2020: OFK Beograd

Marko Mićović (born 14 October 1974) is a Serbian football manager.

== Coaching career ==
In 2017 he was worked as the caretaker manager of OFK Beograd and after that he appointed as the manager of Balzan F.C. in the Maltese Premier League. In 2019 he also worked as an assistant and caretaker at FK Mačva Šabac after that short spell he appointed as the manager of Rad.
