= Aca Obradović =

Serbian football administrator

Personal information
- Full name: Aleksandar Obradović
- Date of birth: 14 September 1922
- Place of birth: Mionica, Kingdom of Serbs, Croats and Slovenes
- Date of death: 23 June 2000 (aged 77)
- Place of death: Belgrade, Serbia, FR Yugoslavia

Managerial career
- Years: Team
- 1974–1976: Castellón
- 1978: OFK Beograd
- 1979: OFK Beograd

Aleksandar "Aca" Obradović (Serbian Cyrillic: Александар Аца Обрадовић; 14 September 1922 – 23 June 2000) was a Yugoslavian/Serbian football administrator, most notable as a technical director of Red Star Belgrade.

== War years ==
Born into a family of four-generation innkeepers in Mionica near Valjevo, he joined and spent two years with the Chetnik movement during World War II, was imprisoned in Banjica concentration camp but managed to escape. The next two years he spent in Vienna but returned to the Chetnik movement in 1944.

== Red Star Belgrade ==
Obradović obtained a university degree, and became an assistant professor at the University of Belgrade Faculty of Medicine. He joined newly formed Red Star Belgrade as a physiotherapist. When he had a choice whether to pursue an academic career and become an associate professor in faculty or a football club administrator, he made the decision to stay in football. He was a member of long listed management structures where he became legendary for uncommon methods of directing a club. Also, he played the same role in the Yugoslavia national team. He was involved in almost all "big" transfers for the club at the time, and also generated the idea for building a "Marakana" - Red Star Belgrade Stadium. His cult status in the club is strongly linked with "Kafana Madera" (in Serbian: a "Madera Tavern") the place where the vast number of football and non football agreements are made. During his era, "Madera" became the epicenter of events in football and society.

== Move to the United States ==
In 1966 after Obradović was expelled from his favorite club by the Communist Committee of Belgrade, he moved to the United States and formed an association football club—the San Francisco Clippers—thus becoming one of the pioneers of association football in the United States. His sense of business came to the fore during the Prague Spring in 1968, when Soviet forces entered the Czechoslovak capital. At the time, it happened that the best Czechoslovak team Dukla Praha and the Soviet Union team were guests in the United States so Obradović formed a four-team tournament with participants: Dukla, Soviet Union, San Francisco Clippers and Mexico (as a host of soon to be Olympics). For that, he made a television broadcasting contract with the NBC worth two million dollars, with the condition that a Soviet and a Czechoslovak team would play in the finals. Unfortunately, that plan failed—just before the final match the Soviet embassy prohibited their team from playing.

In his career, Obradović was also NK Olimpija Ljubljana and Valencia CF administrator. In 1982 he obtained an official FIFA managerial license, thus becoming the first licensed manager in Yugoslavia.

== Death ==
Obradović died on 23 June 2000 in Belgrade aged 77.
