= Michalis Bellis =

Greek footballer (born 1940)

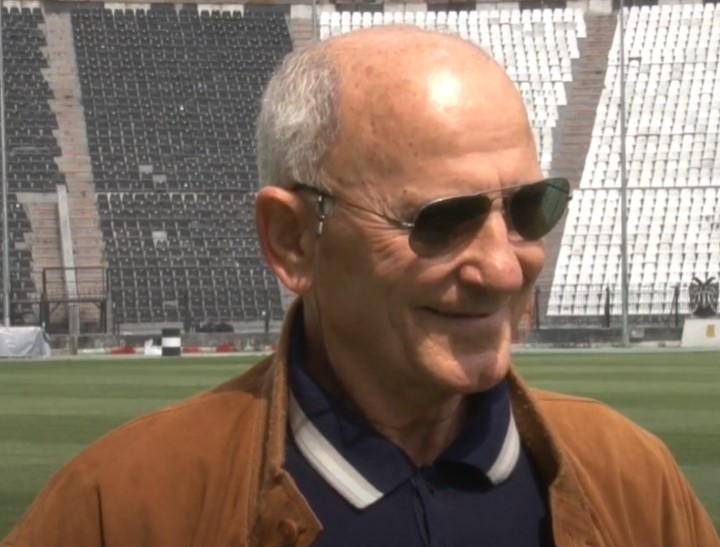

Personal information
- Full name: Michail Bellis
- Date of birth: 1 February 1940 (age 86)
- Place of birth: Thessaloniki, Greece
- Position: Defender

Senior career*
Years	Team	Apps	(Gls)
1958–1959	Polykastro		
1959–1965	Iraklis		
1965–1968	Panathinaikos		
1968–1970	Panachaiki		
1970–1973	PAOK		

International career
1965–1967	Greece	5	(0)

Managerial career
- 1973–1976: PAOK (assistant)
- 1977: Iraklis
- 1978–1979: Rodos
- 1979–1980: Iraklis
- 1980: Rodos
- 1982: Kavala
- 1983: Makedonikos
- 1986: PAOK
- 1987–1988: PAOK
- 1988–1989: Apollon Kalamarias
- 1996: PAOK
- * Club domestic league appearances and goals

Michalis Bellis (Greek: Μιχάλης Μπέλλης; born 1 February 1940) is a Greek retired football defender and later manager.
