= Stevica Kuzmanovski =

Macedonian football manager and player

Personal information
- Date of birth: 16 November 1962 (age 63)
- Place of birth: Tetovo, PR Macedonia, FPR Yugoslavia
- Height: 1.78 m (5 ft 10 in)
- Position: Defender

Youth career
- Teteks

Senior career*
Years	Team	Apps	(Gls)
1982–1983	Partizan	2	(0)
1983–1984	Pelister	31	(1)
1984–1987	OFK Beograd	65	(8)
1987–1990	Rad	45	(4)
1990–1992	OFK Beograd	60	(1)
1992–1994	Kocaelispor	59	(2)
1994	Galatasaray	7	(0)
1994–1995	Antalyaspor	16	(0)
1995–1996	Eskişehirspor	26	(0)
1996–1999	Rad	96	(7)
2000	OFK Beograd	18	(0)
Total		425	(23)

Managerial career
- 2000–2003: OFK Beograd (assistant)
- 2003–2004: OFK Beograd
- 2005: Srem
- 2005–2006: Belasitsa Petrich
- 2007: Srem
- 2007–2009: Slavia Sofia
- 2009: Montana
- 2009–2011: Banants
- 2012: OFK Beograd
- 2016: Montana
- 2019: OFK Beograd
- 2022: OFK Beograd
- * Club domestic league appearances and goals

Stevica Kuzmanovski (Macedonian: Стевица Кузмановски; born 16 November 1962) is a Macedonian football manager and former player.

== Playing career ==
During his career that spanned from the early 1980s to the early 2000s, Kuzmanovski played for Partizan, Pelister, OFK Beograd (three spells), Rad (two spells), Kocaelispor, Galatasaray, Antalyaspor, and Eskişehirspor.

== Managerial career ==
After three years as an assistant at OFK Beograd, Kuzmanovski was appointed as the club's manager in July 2003. He later served as manager of Belasitsa Petrich (October 2005 – September 2006), Slavia Sofia, Montana (twice), and Banants (December 2009 – May 2011).
