= OFK Beograd =

Serbian association football club

- Full name: Omladinski fudbalski klub Beograd
- Nicknames: Romantičari (The Romantics); Plavo-beli (The Blue-Whites)
- Founded: 6 July 1911; 115 years ago as Beogradski sport klub (disputed); 25 March 1945; 81 years ago as Radnički sportski klub Metalac
- Ground: Omladinski Stadium
- Capacity: 10,600
- Chairman: Simo Krunić
- Head coach: Jovan Damjanović
- League: Serbian SuperLiga
- 2025–26: Serbian SuperLiga, 6th of 16
- Website: ofkbeograd.com
Home colours	Away colours	Third colours

OFK Beograd (Serbian Cyrillic: ОФК Београд – Омладински фудбалски клуб Београд, English: Belgrade Youth Football Club), also known in English as OFK Belgrade and currently referred to as OFK Beograd Mozzart Bet (Serbian Cyrillic: ОФК Београд Моцарт Бет) for sponsorship reasons, is a Serbian professional football club based in Belgrade, more precisely in Karaburma, an urban neighborhood of the municipality of Palilula. It is part of the OSD Beograd sport society.

All up, the club has won 5 national championships, in the following seasons: 1930–31, 1932–33, 1934–35, 1935–36, and 1938–39; the club won these titles under their old name of BSK (Beogradski Sport Klub). The club has been cup winners five times also, winning in the following seasons: 1934, 1953, 1955, 1961–62, and 1965–66.

The club has also recorded significant results in European competition, reaching the 1962–63 European Cup Winners' Cup semi-finals where they lost to Tottenham Hotspur. They reached the 1972–73 UEFA Cup quarter-finals where they lost to FC Twente.

== History ==
=== The beginning ===
The club was founded in 1945 as Metalac but it is considered to be the successor of BSK, one of the most prominent football clubs in Kingdom of Serbia and later Kingdom of Yugoslavia. It was also the most successful club between 1923 and 1941, with five national champion titles. BSK played its first game on 13 October 1911 against Šumadija from Kragujevac and won 8–1.

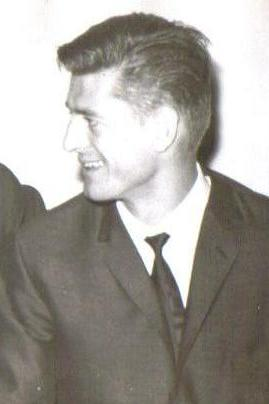
Miloš Milutinović, 1955–56 European Cup top scorer, came to the club from Bayern.

In 1945, after World War II, the club was established under the name Metalac by some former members of BSK. This club carried the name until 1950, when it was renamed to BSK, but in the 1957 the club merged with TSK Šumadija to form OFK Beograd (Serbian Latin: Omladinski fudbalski klub, English: YFC – Youth Football Club).

=== The golden era ===
A two-decade-long "Golden Era" began when the club won the Yugoslav Cup in 1953. Three other Yugoslav Cup wins followed, in 1955 and the 1961–62 and 1965–66 seasons. The club was the Yugoslav First League runner-up twice, in 1954–55 and 1965–66. In the meantime, the club had changed its name once again. In 1957, the club was named OFK Beograd, once again in an attempt to attract spectators to the stadium, especially younger ones who often opted for either Red Star or Partizan. In that time, the players played elegant football and therefore got the nickname of "Romantičari".

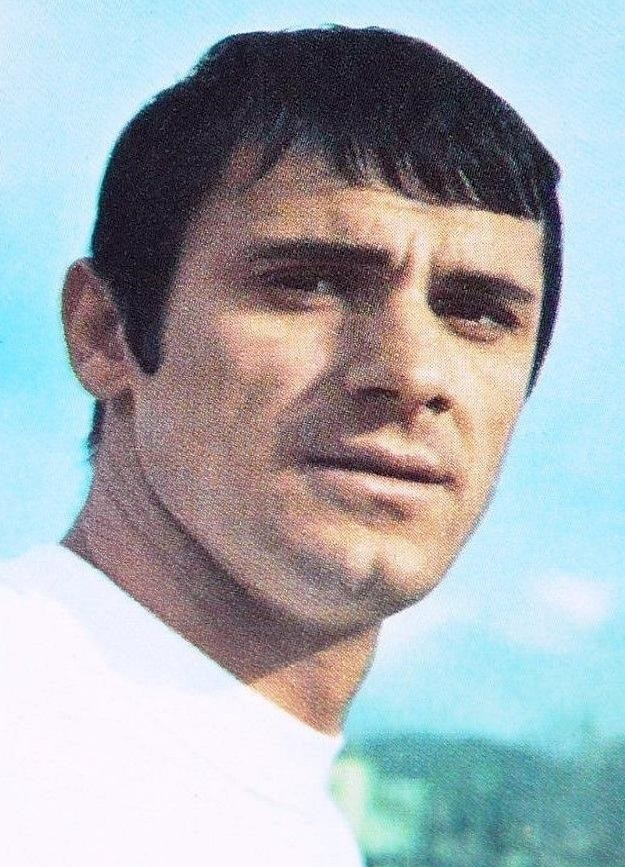
Club legend Josip Skoblar won the European Golden Shoe in 1971.

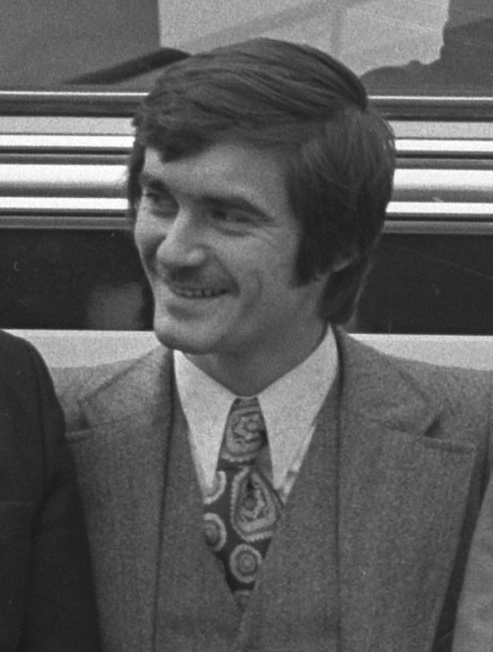
Slobodan Santrač, All time best scorer of the Yugoslav national league

The 1960s and the first half of the 1970s were years of European glory. OFK Beograd had participated eight times in European competitions. Their biggest success came in the 1962–63 European Cup Winners' Cup season, playing in the semi-final against Tottenham Hotspur, eventual champions. In the following ten years, teams such as Napoli, Feyenoord, Panathinaikos, Bologna FC 1909, FC Twente and Juventus also lost to OFK Beograd.

=== The silent fall ===
The Romantičari were not able to take advantage of their success on the domestic and European scene. After several successful seasons, a sudden fall occurred. During the 1980s, the club often changed leagues from the First Division to the Second.

=== Modern era ===
In the summer of 2003, they were back in European competition. They played in the UEFA Intertoto Cup. OFK defeated Estonian side Narva Trans at home by the score of 6–1, but UEFA cancelled the result because of a smoke bomb being thrown on the field during the game. Consequently, only the second leg result would count. OFK Beograd won in Tallinn with a score of 5–3. They were eliminated in the second round by Czech club 1. FC Slovácko, with a score of 4–3.

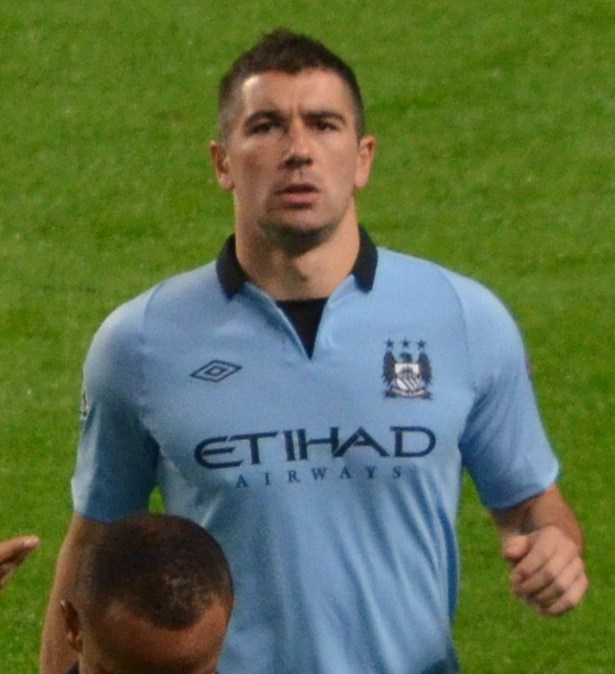
Aleksandar Kolarov, with whom OFK Beograd reached the national cup final

The club was back on the European stage in 2004. They started playing in the second round of the Intertoto Cup and eliminated Dinaburg. In the third round, OFK went on to play against Tampere United. OFK Beograd defeated their Finnish opponents and went on to play in the semifinals. They were eliminated by Atlético Madrid losing the first leg 1–3 at home with Aleksandar Simić scoring for OFK and Fernando Torres, Diego Simeone and Ariel Ibagaza scoring for Atlético, losing the second leg 2–0 in Madrid meant OFK were eliminated 1–5 on aggregate. Even though OFK were eliminated it was seen as an honour and a return to the club's glory days to have a European powerhouse such as Atlético play at Omladinski Stadium with world class talents such as Torres and Simeone.

In 2005, the club entered the UEFA Cup in the second round of qualifying losing to Lokomotiv Plovdiv on the away goals rule. In 2006, the club faced French side Auxerre in the UEFA Cup. In the first game, in Belgrade, OFK defeated their opponents by the score of 1–0 a goal from centre-back Miloš Bajalica in the 31st minute of play proving the difference, a great result considering Auxerre was then one of France's strongest clubs. In the second game OFK Beograd lost 5–1 with the result standing at 2–1 for Auxerre with ten minutes to play, a result which would see OFK Beograd eliminate Auxerre. However, the young OFK team capitulated in the last ten minutes of play conceding three goals and were eliminated 5–2 on aggregate. In the 2010 Europa League, OFK beat Torpedo Zhodino of Belarus 3–2 on aggregate and went on to play Galatasaray where they lost 7–3 on aggregate, coming back from two-nil down to draw 2–2 with late goals been scored by Miloš Krstić and Nenad Injac in Turkey against Galatasaray but ultimately losing the second leg 1–5 at home with Danilo Nikolić scoring the only goal for OFK.

OFK Beograd were relegated from the Serbian SuperLiga after finishing fifteenth in the 2015–16 season. The next season saw relegation from the 2016–17 Serbian First League after finishing bottom of the table. The club played in the Serbian League Belgrade in the 2017–18 season (their first season in the Serbian third tier), finishing in second place behind Žarkovo who were promoted to the Serbian second tier.

In November 2018 the "Klub prijatelja OFK Beograda" was formed (trans. "Club of Friends of OFK Beograd") with the goal of saving the club from becoming extinct. The KPO is made up of fans who want to see OFK return to its former glories competing at the very top of the first tier of Serbian football.

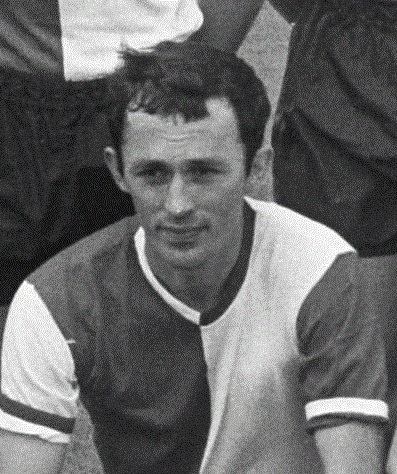
Spasoje Samardžić, Eredevisie champion with Feyenoord

In their second year in the Serbian third division, OFK finished in fifth position on 46 points, with Grafičar being promoted to the second division. OFK did however manage to win the Belgrade Cup.

In the 2019–20 season, OFK commenced their third successive season in the Serbian third tier with hiring former accomplished player Stevica Kuzmanovski as coach. On 25 September 2019, in the last 32 of the Serbian Cup, OFK faced their city rivals FK Rad and won 3–2 with two goals from Andreja Lazović and one goal from Stefan Janković. This was considered quite a success as OFK where at this time in the Serbian third division and FK Rad in the Serbian top division the SuperLiga. COVID-19 Pandemic resulted in the season coming to a halt for clubs in the third division Belgrade league, OFK finished the season in a disappointing 3rd place. The eventual champions were IMT who were promoted to the Serbian First League (Second Division of the Serbian football pyramid), another hammer blow for OFK as a 4th consecutive season in the Serbian 3rd tier would come in season 2020–21 for a club barely surviving financially. At the conclusion of the 2022–23 season, OFK finished in first place in the Serbian League Belgrade, securing promotion to the Serbian First League for the 2023–24 season.

On 14 August 2024, OFK was renamed to OFK Beograd Mozzart Bet for sponsorship reasons.

== Honours ==
=== Domestic ===
==== League ====
- Yugoslav First League
  - Winners (5): 1931, 1933, 1935, 1936, 1938–39
- Yugoslav Second League
  - Winners (3): 1958–59 (East), 1979–80 (East), 1984–85 (East)
- Serbian First League
  - Winners (1): 2023–24

==== Cups ====
- Yugoslav Cup
  - Winners (5): 1934, 1953, 1955, 1961–62, 1965–66
  - Runners-up: 1938
- Serbia and Montenegro Cup
  - Runners-up: 2005–06

=== European ===
- UEFA Cup Winners' Cup
  - Semi-finals: 1962–63
- UEFA Cup
  - Quarter-finals: 1972–73
- Inter-Cities Fairs Cup
  - Semi-finals: 1958–60

=== Unofficial ===
- Serbian Championship
  - Winners: 1920, 1920–21, 1921–22
- Serbian League (top level between 1940 and 1944)
  - Winners: 1939–40, 1940–41, 1942–43, 1943–44
  - Runners-up: 1941–42
- People's Republic of Serbia League (Belgrade championship)
  - Winners: 1945
- Serbian Cup
  - Winners: 1941

== European competitions ==
Before UEFA was founded (in 1954), OFK Beograd, under the name of Beogradski Sport Klub (BSK), participated in Mitropa Cup, the first really international European football competition. The club competed for five seasons without a big success, usually stopped by teams from Hungary, the major football power at the time. In UEFA competitions, OFK Beograd played 16 seasons, the biggest success being reaching the semifinals of the 1962–63 European Cup Winners' Cup.

=== UEFA competitions summary ===
OFK Beograd	Seasons	P	W	D	L	F	A	Match Pts%W	Ties P	Ties W	Ties L	Ties %W
Representing Serbia	2	4	2	0	2	4	8	50.00	2	-	2	-
Representing Yugoslavia (Socialist Federal Republic of Yugoslavia)	8	38	14	7	17	64	69	46.05	18	10	8	55.56
Total	10	42	16	7	19	68	76	46.43	20	10	10	50.00

== Youth system ==
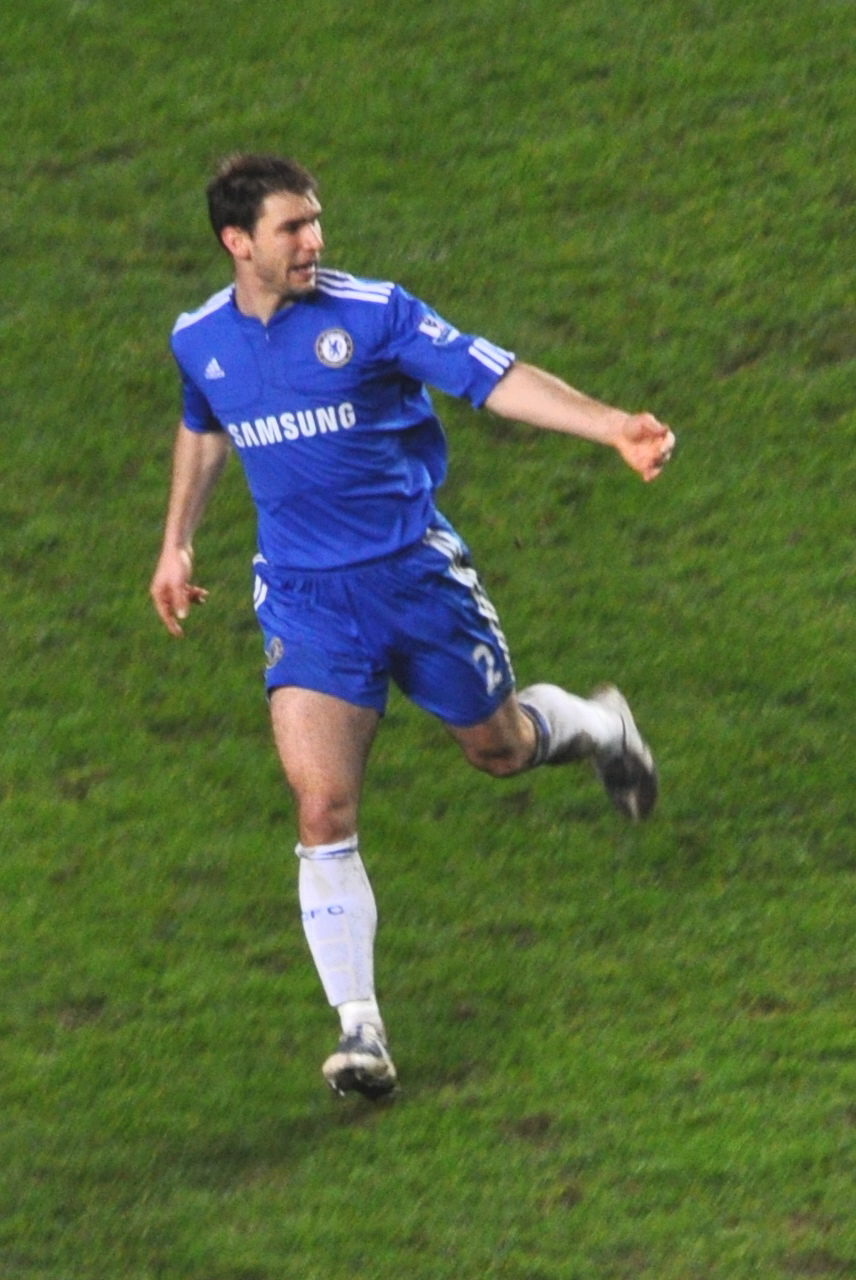
Branislav Ivanović honed his skills at OFK Beograd.

OFK Beograd's youth system has a reputation as one of the best in the history of Serbian football. In its 107 years of existence, it produced and promoted hundreds of players who played not just for the club, but for the national team as well. Among these players are the likes of Josip Skoblar, Spasoje Samardžić, Ilija Petković, Slobodan Santrač, Dragoslav Stepanović, Mitar Mrkela, Saša Ćurčić, Duško Tošić, Branislav Ivanović, Aleksandar Kolarov, and many others.

Since OFK Beograd's existence, attention was always turned to the younger categories of players. Recently, the club has built a new private training center, comprising eight playing fields along with training equipment with the newest technology.

A youth school was created with 150 players born between 1996 and 1999. There are also seven competitive teams for which more than 170 players are playing. The youth system compromises around 20 highly qualified coaches who are all specialized in certain areas of the game. Most of the coaches are former players who spent years at the club and who also went through the same youth system. Several physios are also present and are equipped with the newest technology for their work.

== Rivals ==
OFK Beograd's biggest rivals are FK Rad from the Belgrade suburb of Banjica. It is known as the small Belgrade derby. In the mid-2000s in a game between the two clubs in the last game of the season OFK scored a last minute equalizer against Rad meaning Rad were relegated for the first time in almost twenty-five years. In the following season when OFK were playing in the Intertoto Cup Rad fans threw a number of flares from outside the stadium forcing UEFA to award the game 3–0 against OFK even though OFK won the game 6–1 against Estonian club Narva Trans.

Other rivals to a much lesser degree include Crvena Zvezda and FK Partizan.

After being relegated to Serbian League Belgrade OFK Beograd had a bitter rivalry with FK Zemun.

== Supporters ==
OFK Beograd's fans are commonly known as Plava Unija (The Blue Union) since 1994. When Beogradski Sportski Klub (BSK) was founded in 1911, the club which dominated the fields of the Kingdom of Serbs, Croats and Slovenes developed a significant fan base. Throughout the several wars that took place since the founding of BSK, the club's turbulent history has produced adverse effects on the average attendance of today's matches in which OFK Beograd plays.

An organized group appeared for the first time in 1984 under the name of "Blue Thunders". The group lived under that name until 1990. When they were influenced by the rise of nationalism in Yugoslavia, they change their name to "Sokolovi" (The Falcons). The group officially collapsed in 1993 about a year after UN sanctions were put on FR Yugoslavia. The fans' love towards the club was certainly not forgotten and in 1994 a new group is founded – Blue Union Belgrade. The name remains the title of OFK Beograd's main group of ultras.

OFK Beograd's fans have been known to be resistant of past regimes. In the 1990s, Milicionar, a pro-regime police-backed team, entered the first division. When OFK Beograd first played against them, the OFK fans reacted with creation of a banner which bore the message "Goal Against the Regime." Among other things, members of Plava Unija also reinstated the old ex-Yugoslav firms habit of finding local home crews when their team was on away matches, no matter which Serbian town or city was in question.

Plava Unija fostered a friendship with Voždovac's fans, "Invalidi" while the club still played in Yugoslavia's second tier from 1996 to 1998. That friendship still remains to this day. OFK Beograd is also known to be supported by fans of Dynamo Moscow and Anorthosis Famagusta.

== Players ==
=== Current squad ===
As of 19 September 2026

Note: Flags indicate national team as defined under FIFA eligibility rules; some limited exceptions apply. Players may hold more than one non-FIFA nationality.

No.	Pos.	Nation	Player
2	DF	MKD	Stefan Despotovski
3	MF	GHA	Edmund Addo (on loan from Red Star Belgrade)
4	DF	SRB	Andrej Pavlović (vice-captain)
5	DF	SRB	Darko Gojković
6	MF	PER	Sergio Peña
7	FW	NED	Tayrell Wouter
9	FW	USA	Ethan Hoard
10	MF	SRB	Saša Marković (captain)
11	FW	GIB	Tjay De Barr
14	MF	SRB	Miljan Momčilović
15	DF	SRB	Nikola Maraš
16	DF	SRB	Leon Ivanović
17	MF	BIH	Muhamed Bešić
18	MF	CIV	Hervé Touré
19	FW	SRB	Đorđe Ranković
20	MF	SRB	Jovan Šljivić (on loan from Red Star Belgrade)

No.	Pos.	Nation	Player
23	DF	SRB	Milan Rodić
24	DF	SRB	Uroš Stojanović
26	DF	SEN	Mamadou Fall
27	FW	NGR	Hameed Aderoju
28	MF	SRB	Jovan Mrvaljević
31	GK	SRB	Vuk Draškić
42	FW	CIV	Yacouba Silué
45	DF	SRB	Aleksej Vukičević
47	DF	SRB	Strahinja Stojković (on loan from Saint-Étienne)
71	FW	SRB	Luka Zarić (on loan from Red Star Belgrade)
77	DF	SRB	Marko Gobeljić
80	GK	SRB	Vuk Barlov
88	MF	SRB	Filip Halabrin
91	MF	SRB	Aleksa Vasilić
97	GK	SRB	Nedeljko Stojišić

=== Players with multiple nationalities ===
- (Serbia) (Croatia) Aleksej Vukičević
- (Bosnia and Herzegovina) (Germany) Muhamed Bešić
- (North Macedonia) (Serbia) Stefan Despotovski
- (Netherlands) (Suriname) Tayrell Wouter
- (Peru) (Spain) Sergio Peña
- (Ivory Coast) (France) Hervé Touré

=== Out on loan ===
Note: Flags indicate national team as defined under FIFA eligibility rules; some limited exceptions apply. Players may hold more than one non-FIFA nationality.

No.	Pos.	Nation	Player
—	DF	SRB	Strahinja Luković (at Smederevo 1924 until the end of the 2026–27 season)
—	DF	SRB	Mateja Krstić (at T6 NIKA Lepušnica until the end of the 2026–27 season)
—	DF	SRB	Nemanja Milunović (at GSP Polet Dorćol until the end of the 2026–27 season)
—	MF	CIV	Issiaka Dembele (at Borac 1926 until the end of the 2026–27 season)

No.	Pos.	Nation	Player
—	FW	NGR	Prince Benjamin Obasi (at Grafičar until the end of the 2026–27 season)
—	FW	SRB	Vasilije Grbović (at T6 NIKA Lepušnica until the end of the 2026–27 season)
—	FW	NGR	Emmanuel Egeoluoha (at Metalac until the end of the 2026–27 season)

== Club officials ==
=== Coaching staff ===
Position	Name
Head coach	(Serbia) Jovan Damjanović
Assistant coach	(Serbia) Stevan Bates (Serbia) Đorđe Ivelja (Serbia) Bojan Pavlović
Goalkeeping coach	(Serbia) Rade Grahovac
Fitness coach	(Serbia) Vlada Živanović (Serbia) Vladimir Božić (Serbia) Nemanja Milanović
Chief analyst	(Serbia) Mladen Jovančić
Club doctor	(Serbia) Petar Stojković
Physiotherapist	(Serbia) Marko Igrutinović (Serbia) Vuk Miletić
General director	(Serbia) Balša Terzić
Sporting director	(Serbia) Andrej Mrkela
Technical director	(Serbia) Marko Mitrović
General secretary	(Serbia) Vladimir Rašić
Club president	(Bosnia and Herzegovina) Simo Krunić
Vice-president	(Serbia) Kostadin Terzić

== UEFA competitions ==
- Qualified for Europe in 14 seasons (2 in European Cup Winners' Cup, 9 in Europa League/UEFA Cup/Inter-Cities Fairs Cup, 3 in Intertoto Cup)

Season	Competition	Round	Country	Club	Home	Away	Aggregate
1962–63	UEFA Cup Winners' Cup	QR	(East Germany)	Chemie Halle	2–0	3–3	5–3
1962–63	UEFA Cup Winners' Cup	R1	(Northern Ireland)	Portadown	5–1	2–3	7–4
1962–63	UEFA Cup Winners' Cup	Quarter-final	(Italy)	Napoli	2–0	1–3	3–3 (3–1 Playoff)
1962–63	UEFA Cup Winners' Cup	Semi-final	(England)	Tottenham Hotspur	1–2	1–3	2–5
1963–64	Inter-Cities Fairs Cup	R1	(Italy)	Juventus	2–1	1–2	3–3 (0–1 Playoff)
1964–65	Inter-Cities Fairs Cup	R1	(Spain)	Athletic Bilbao	0–2	2–2	2–4
1966–67	UEFA Cup Winners' Cup	R1	(Soviet Union)	Spartak Moscow	1–3	0–3	1–6
1968–69	Inter-Cities Fairs Cup	R1	(Romania)	Rapid Bucureşti	6–1	1–3	7–4
1968–69	Inter-Cities Fairs Cup	R2	(Italy)	Bologna	1–0	1–1	2–1
1968–69	Inter-Cities Fairs Cup	R3	(Turkey)	Goztepe	3–1	0–2	3–3 (a)
1971–72	UEFA Cup	R1	(Sweden)	Djurgården	4–1	2–2	6–3
1971–72	UEFA Cup	R2	(East Germany)	FC Carl Zeiss Jena	1–1	0–4	1–5
1972–73	UEFA Cup	R1	(Czechoslovakia)	Dukla Prague	3–1	2–2	5–3
1972–73	UEFA Cup	R2	(Netherlands)	Feyenoord	2–1	3–4	5–5 (a)
1972–73	UEFA Cup	R3	(Bulgaria)	Beroe Stara Zagora	0–0	3–1	3–1
1972–73	UEFA Cup	Quarter-final	(Netherlands)	Twente	3–2	0–2	3–4
1973–74	UEFA Cup	R1	(Greece)	Panathinaikos	0–1	2–1	2–2 (a)
1973–74	UEFA Cup	R2	(Soviet Union)	Dinamo Tbilisi	1–5	0–3	1–8
2003–04	Intertoto Cup	R1	(Estonia)	Narva Trans	6–1	5–3	11–4
2003–04	Intertoto Cup	R2	(Czech Republic)	Slovácko	3–3	0–1	3–4
2004–05	Intertoto Cup	R2	(Latvia)	Dinaburg	3–1	2–0	5–1
2004–05	Intertoto Cup	R3	(Finland)	Tampere United	1–0	0–0	1–0
2004–05	Intertoto Cup	Semi-final	(Spain)	Atlético Madrid	1–3	0–2	1–5
2005–06	UEFA Cup	QR2	(Bulgaria)	Lokomotiv Plovdiv	2–1	0–1	2–2 (a)
2006–07	UEFA Cup	QR2	(France)	Auxerre	1–0	1–5	2–5
2008–09	Intertoto Cup	R2	(Greece)	Panionios	1–0	1–3	2–3
2010–11	Europa League	QR2	(Belarus)	Torpedo Zhodino	2–2	1–0	3–2
2010–11	Europa League	QR3	(Turkey)	Galatasaray	1–5	2–2	3–7

== Notable former players ==
To appear in this section a player must have played at least one international match for their national team at any time.

Yugoslavia

- (Kingdom of Yugoslavia) Milorad Arsenijević
- (Kingdom of Yugoslavia) August Bivec
- (Kingdom of Yugoslavia) Radivoj Božić
- (Kingdom of Yugoslavia) Vojin Božović
- (Kingdom of Yugoslavia) Ljubiša Đorđević
- (Kingdom of Yugoslavia) Milorad Dragićević
- (Kingdom of Yugoslavia) Prvoslav Dragićević
- (Kingdom of Yugoslavia) (Banovina of Croatia) Ernest Dubac
- (Kingdom of Yugoslavia) (Banovina of Croatia) Franjo Glaser
- (Kingdom of Yugoslavia) Svetislav Glišović
- (Kingdom of Yugoslavia) (Banovina of Croatia) Ivan Jazbinšek
- (Kingdom of Yugoslavia) Bruno Knežević
- (Kingdom of Yugoslavia) Andreja Kojić
- (Kingdom of Yugoslavia) (Banovina of Croatia) Gustav Lechner
- (Kingdom of Yugoslavia) Petar Manola
- (Kingdom of Yugoslavia) Blagoje Marjanović
- (Kingdom of Yugoslavia) Milorad Mitrović
- (Kingdom of Yugoslavia) Milorad Nikolić
- (Kingdom of Yugoslavia) Branimir Porobić
- (Kingdom of Yugoslavia) Predrag Radovanović
- (Kingdom of Yugoslavia) Janko Rodin
- (Kingdom of Yugoslavia) Nikola Simić
- (Kingdom of Yugoslavia) Kuzman Sotirović
- (Kingdom of Yugoslavia) Slavko Šurdonja
- (Kingdom of Yugoslavia) Aleksandar Tirnanić
- (Kingdom of Yugoslavia) Dragomir Tošić
- (Kingdom of Yugoslavia) Svetislav Valjarević
- (Kingdom of Yugoslavia) Đorđe Vujadinović
- (Socialist Federal Republic of Yugoslavia) Sava Antić
- (Socialist Federal Republic of Yugoslavia) Slobodan Batričević
- (Socialist Federal Republic of Yugoslavia) Petar Borota
- (Socialist Federal Republic of Yugoslavia) Srđan Čebinac
- (Socialist Federal Republic of Yugoslavia) Dragan Gugleta
- (Socialist Federal Republic of Yugoslavia) Stanoje Jocić
- (Socialist Federal Republic of Yugoslavia) Miodrag Jovanović
- (Socialist Federal Republic of Yugoslavia) Tomislav Kaloperović
- (Socialist Federal Republic of Yugoslavia) Srboljub Krivokuća
- (Socialist Federal Republic of Yugoslavia) (Kingdom of Yugoslavia) Frane Matošić
- (Socialist Federal Republic of Yugoslavia) Miloš Milutinović
- (Socialist Federal Republic of Yugoslavia) Mitar Mrkela
- (Socialist Federal Republic of Yugoslavia) (Kingdom of Yugoslavia) Srđan Mrkušić
- (Socialist Federal Republic of Yugoslavia) Ilija Petković
- (Socialist Federal Republic of Yugoslavia) Petar Radenković
- (Socialist Federal Republic of Yugoslavia) Spasoje Samardžić
- (Socialist Federal Republic of Yugoslavia) Slobodan Santrač
- (Socialist Federal Republic of Yugoslavia) Dragoslav Šekularac
- (Socialist Federal Republic of Yugoslavia) Vasilije Šijaković
- (Socialist Federal Republic of Yugoslavia) Josip Skoblar
- (Socialist Federal Republic of Yugoslavia) Dragoslav Stepanović
- (Socialist Federal Republic of Yugoslavia) Lazar Tasić
- (Federal Republic of Yugoslavia) Nikoslav Bjegović
- (Federal Republic of Yugoslavia) (Socialist Federal Republic of Yugoslavia) Saša Ćurčić
- (Federal Republic of Yugoslavia) Petar Divić
- (Serbia and Montenegro) Nenad Jestrović
- (Serbia and Montenegro) Đorđe Jokić
- (Serbia and Montenegro) Miloš Kolaković
- (Federal Republic of Yugoslavia) Aleksandar Kristić
- (Federal Republic of Yugoslavia) Nenad Lalatović
- (Federal Republic of Yugoslavia) Milan Obradović
- (Serbia and Montenegro) Dušan Petković
- (Federal Republic of Yugoslavia) (Socialist Federal Republic of Yugoslavia) Gordan Petrić
- (Federal Republic of Yugoslavia) Saša Petrović
- (Federal Republic of Yugoslavia) Mihajlo Pjanović
- (Federal Republic of Yugoslavia) Dejan Rađenović
- (Federal Republic of Yugoslavia) Saša Stevanović
- (Federal Republic of Yugoslavia) Boris Vasković
- (Federal Republic of Yugoslavia) Aleksandar Živković

Serbia

- (Serbia) Nikola Aksentijević
- (Serbia) Stefan Babović
- (Serbia) Nikola Beljić
- (Serbia) Jovan Damjanović
- (Serbia) Aleksandar Ignjovski
- (Serbia) Radiša Ilić
- (Serbia) (Serbia and Montenegro) Branislav Ivanović
- (Serbia) Aleksandar Jevtić
- (Serbia) Andrija Kaluđerović
- (Serbia) Aleksandar Kolarov
- (Serbia) (Serbia and Montenegro) Ognjen Koroman
- (Serbia) Nenad Krstičić
- (Serbia) Milan Lukač
- (Serbia) Milovan Milović
- (Serbia) Ognjen Mimović
- (Serbia) Aleksandar Paločević
- (Serbia) Slobodan Rajković
- (Serbia) Milan Rodić
- (Serbia) Bojan Šaranov
- (Serbia) Stefan Šćepović
- (Serbia) Vojislav Stanković
- (Serbia) Ivan Stevanović
- (Serbia) Duško Tošić
- (Serbia) Aleksandar Trišović
- (Serbia) Veseljko Trivunović
- (Serbia) Saša Zdjelar

Armenia

- (Armenia) Ognjen Čančarević

Australia

- (Australia) Branko Buljevic
- (Australia) Milan Ivanović
- (Australia) Doug Utjesenovic

Azerbaijan

- (Azerbaijan) Branimir Subašić

Bosnia and Herzegovina

- (Bosnia and Herzegovina) Faruk Hujdurović
- (Bosnia and Herzegovina) Petar Jelić
- (Bosnia and Herzegovina) Đorđe Kamber

Bulgaria

- (Bulgaria) Blagoy Simeonov

Cameroon

- (Cameroon) Aboubakar Oumarou

Cyprus

- (Cyprus) Milenko Špoljarić

France

- (France) (Kingdom of Yugoslavia) Ivan Bek

Kazakhstan

- (Kazakhstan) Nenad Erić

Latvia

- (Latvia) Oļegs Karavajevs

Lithuania

- (Lithuania) Kęstutis Ruzgys

Macedonia

- (North Macedonia) Aleksandar Bajevski
- (North Macedonia) Filip Despotovski
- (North Macedonia) Boban Grnčarov
- (North Macedonia) Hristijan Kirovski
- (North Macedonia) Bojan Markoski
- (North Macedonia) Darko Micevski
- (North Macedonia) Angelko Panov
- (North Macedonia) Ostoja Stjepanović

Malta

- (Malta) Nenad Veselji

Montenegro

- (Montenegro) Vladan Adžić
- (Montenegro) (Serbia and Montenegro) Marko Baša
- (Montenegro) (Federal Republic of Yugoslavia) Dragan Bogavac
- (Montenegro) Vladimir Božović
- (Montenegro) Miodrag Džudović
- (Montenegro) Petar Grbić
- (Montenegro) Igor Ivanović
- (Montenegro) Marko Janković
- (Montenegro) Mladen Kašćelan
- (Montenegro) Ivan Kecojević
- (Montenegro) Nemanja Nikolić
- (Montenegro) Mitar Novaković
- (Montenegro) Milorad Peković
- (Montenegro) Milan Purović
- (Montenegro) Ivan Vuković

Romania

- (Romania) Svetozar Popović
- (Romania) Rudolf Wetzer

Slovakia

- (Slovakia) (Kingdom of Yugoslavia) Ján Podhradský

Uganda

- (Uganda) Khalid Aucho

United States

- (United States) Ilija Mitić

For the list of current and former players with Wikipedia article, please see: Category:OFK Beograd players.

== Historical list of coaches ==
- (Austria) Adolf Engel (1929–31)
- (Kingdom of Yugoslavia) Nikola Simić (1931–32)
- (Hungary) Sándor Nemes (1933–34)
- (Kingdom of Yugoslavia) Nikola Simić (1934)
- (Austria) Josef Uridil (1935–1936)
- (Hungary) Sándor Nemes (1936–1938)
- (Hungary) István Mészáros (1939–40)
- (Kingdom of Yugoslavia) Svetozar Popović (1941)
- (Socialist Federal Republic of Yugoslavia) Boško Ralić (1946–47)
- (Socialist Federal Republic of Yugoslavia) Ljubiša Broćić (1947–50)
- (Socialist Federal Republic of Yugoslavia) Milovan Ćirić (1951–53)
- (Socialist Federal Republic of Yugoslavia) Blagoje Marjanović (1953–56)
- (Socialist Federal Republic of Yugoslavia) Vojin Božović (1956–57)
- (Socialist Federal Republic of Yugoslavia) Prvoslav Mihajlović (1957–59)
- (Socialist Federal Republic of Yugoslavia) Vojin Božović (1959–60)
- (Socialist Federal Republic of Yugoslavia) Đorđe Vujadinović (1960–61)
- (Socialist Federal Republic of Yugoslavia) Milovan Ćirić (1961–63)
- (Socialist Federal Republic of Yugoslavia) Mile Kos & (Socialist Federal Republic of Yugoslavia) Sava Antić (1963–64)
- (Socialist Federal Republic of Yugoslavia) Milovan Ćirić (1964–65)
- (Socialist Federal Republic of Yugoslavia) Dragiša Milić (1965–66)
- (Socialist Federal Republic of Yugoslavia) Dragiša Milić & (Socialist Federal Republic of Yugoslavia) Miloš Milutinović (1966–67)
- (Socialist Federal Republic of Yugoslavia) Žarko Mihajlović (1967–69)
- (Socialist Federal Republic of Yugoslavia) Gojko Zec (1969–70)
- (Socialist Federal Republic of Yugoslavia) Božidar Drenovac (1970–1971)
- (Socialist Federal Republic of Yugoslavia) Boris Marović (1971–1973)
- (Socialist Federal Republic of Yugoslavia) Milutin Šoškić (1973–1976)
- (Socialist Federal Republic of Yugoslavia) Nikola Beogradac (1976–1978)
- (Socialist Federal Republic of Yugoslavia) Aca Obradović (1978)
- (Socialist Federal Republic of Yugoslavia) Marko Valok (1978)
- (Socialist Federal Republic of Yugoslavia) Aca Obradović (1979)
- (Socialist Federal Republic of Yugoslavia) Boris Marović (1979–1980)
- (Socialist Federal Republic of Yugoslavia) Gojko Zec (1980–83)
- (Socialist Federal Republic of Yugoslavia) Dragutin Spasojević (1983–84)
- (Socialist Federal Republic of Yugoslavia) Velimir Đorđević (1984–1988)
- (Socialist Federal Republic of Yugoslavia) Ilija Petković (1988–1989)
- (Socialist Federal Republic of Yugoslavia) Gojko Zec (1989–90)
- (Socialist Federal Republic of Yugoslavia) Milan Živadinović (1990–1991)
- (Federal Republic of Yugoslavia) Ilija Petković (1991–1993)
- (Federal Republic of Yugoslavia) Blagomir Krivokuća (1993–1995)
- (Federal Republic of Yugoslavia) Krsto Mitrović (1995–1996)
- (Federal Republic of Yugoslavia) Božidar Milenković (1996–1997)
- (Federal Republic of Yugoslavia) Slavko Jović (1997)
- (Federal Republic of Yugoslavia) Stojan Vukašinović (1997-1998)
- (Federal Republic of Yugoslavia) Đorđe Serpak (1998)
- (Federal Republic of Yugoslavia) Miodrag Ješić (1998–1999)
- (Federal Republic of Yugoslavia) Branislav Vukašinović (1999)
- (Federal Republic of Yugoslavia) Zlatko Krmpotić (1999–2000)
- (Federal Republic of Yugoslavia) Radmilo Ivančević (2000)
- (Federal Republic of Yugoslavia) Zvonko Varga (2000–2001)
- (Federal Republic of Yugoslavia) Dragoljub Bekvalac (2001–2003)
- (North Macedonia) Stevica Kuzmanovski (2003–2004)
- (Serbia and Montenegro) Dragoljub Bekvalac (5 Apr 2004 – 15 May 2004)
- (Serbia and Montenegro) Branko Babić (30 Jun 2004 – Sept 30, 2005)
- (Serbia) Slobodan Krčmarević (23 Oct 2005 – 24 Dec 2006)
- (Serbia) Ratko Dostanić (25 Dec 2006 – 31 Mar 2007)
- (Serbia) Branislav Vukašinović (2 Apr 2007 – 8 Mar 2008)
- (Serbia) Ljupko Petrović (11 Mar 2008 – 21 Apr 2008)
- (Serbia) Mihailo Ivanović (21 Apr 2008 – 17 Apr 2009)
- (Bosnia and Herzegovina) Simo Krunić (13 Apr 2009 – 30 Jun 2009)
- (Serbia) Dejan Đurđević (1 Jul 2009 – 27 Dec 2011)
- (Serbia) Branko Babić (10 Jan 2012 – 21 May 2012)
- (North Macedonia) Stevica Kuzmanovski (29 May 2012 – Sep 16, 2012)
- (Serbia) Zoran Milinković (Sep 18, 2012 – Sep 9, 2013)
- (Serbia) Zlatko Krmpotić (Sep 11, 2013 – 23 Dec 2013)
- (Serbia) Milan Milanović (26 Dec 2013 – 16 Mar 2014)
- (Serbia) Zlatko Krmpotić (2014)
- (Serbia) Dejan Đurđević (2014–15)
- (Serbia) Vladimir Petrović (2015)
- (Serbia) Dragoljub Bekvalac (2015)
- (Serbia) Miodrag Radanović (2015)
- (Montenegro) Dragan Radojičić (2016)
- (Serbia) Slavko Matić (2016)
- (Serbia) Dražen Đukić (2016)
- (Serbia) Ljubiša Stamenković (2016–17)
- (Serbia) Marko Mićović (2017)
- (Serbia) Petar Divić (2017–18)
- (Serbia) Uroš Kalinić (2018–19)
- (North Macedonia) Stevica Kuzmanovski (2019)
- (Serbia) Nikola Puača (2019–20)
- (Serbia) Marko Mićović (2020)
- (Serbia) Goran Lazarević (2022)
- (Serbia) Miodrag Anđelković (2020–8 Dec 21)
- (Serbia) Goran Lazarević (2022)
- (North Macedonia) Stevica Kuzmanovski (2022) caretaker
- (Serbia) Nenad Grozdić (2022)
- (Bosnia and Herzegovina) Simo Krunić (2023–25)
- (Serbia) Jovan Damjanović (Jan 2026–present)

== Shirt sponsors and manufacturers ==
Period	Kit Manufacturer	Shirt Sponsor
2006–2010	Joma	Citroën
2010–2011	Jako	Arena Sport
2011	Jako	None
2012	Jako	FOX
2012–2013	Onze	FOX
2014–2023	Onze	DDOR
2023-Present	Joma	Mozzart Bet
