= Branko Babić =

Serbian football manager and player

Personal information
- Date of birth: 11 September 1950 (age 76)
- Place of birth: Zemun, PR Serbia, FPR Yugoslavia

Senior career*
Years	Team	Apps	(Gls)
1969–1972	Osijek	39	(6)
1972–1973	Galenika Zemun		
1975–1976	Beringen	5	(0)
1976–1977	Saint-Dié	10	(3)

Managerial career
- 1993: Napredak Kruševac
- 2000: Mito HollyHock
- 2001–2002: Shimizu S-Pulse (assistant)
- 2003–2004: Čukarički
- 2004–2005: OFK Beograd
- 2006–2007: Čukarički
- 2007–2008: Budućnost Podgorica
- 2009–2010: Vojvodina
- 2011: Persis Solo
- 2012: OFK Beograd
- 2014: Vojvodina
- 2014: Gyeongnam FC (caretaker)
- * Club domestic league appearances and goals

Branko "Sosa" Babić (Serbian Cyrillic: Бранко Соса Бабић; born 11 September 1950) is a Serbian former football manager and player.

== Playing career ==
Babić made his senior debut with Yugoslav Second League club Osijek in the 1969–70 season. He also played abroad for Beringen (Belgium) and Saint-Dié (France).

== Managerial career ==
During his managerial career, Babić worked at numerous clubs in his homeland and abroad, including Napredak Kruševac (1993), Mito HollyHock (2000), Čukarički (2003–04), OFK Beograd (May 2004–October 2005), Čukarički (2006–07), Budućnost Podgorica (November 2007–September 2008), Vojvodina (October 2009–March 2010), Persis Solo (2011), OFK Beograd (January–May 2012), and Vojvodina (January–May 2014). He also served as caretaker manager of Gyeongnam FC (August–December 2014).

With Budućnost Podgorica, Babić won the 2007–08 Montenegrin First League. He also won the 2013–14 Serbian Cup with Vojvodina.

== Managerial statistics ==
Managerial record by team and tenure
Team	From	To	Record				
Team	From	To	P	W	D	L	Win %
Mito HollyHock	2000	2000	40	15	4	21	37.50
Vojvodina	October 2009	March 2010	12	6	2	4	50.00
Vojvodina	January 2014	May 2014	16	7	5	4	43.75
Total			68	28	11	29	41.18

== Honours ==
Budućnost Podgorica

- Montenegrin First League: 2007–08

Vojvodina

- Serbian Cup: 2013–14
