= Gojko Zec =

Yugoslav football manager and player

Personal information
- Full name: Gojko Zec
- Date of birth: 15 September 1935
- Place of birth: Orahovica, Kingdom of Yugoslavia
- Date of death: 3 November 1995 (aged 60)
- Place of death: Luanda, Angola

Senior career*
Years	Team	Apps	(Gls)
1964	Voždovački	2	(0)

Managerial career
- 1965–1966: Voždovački
- 1966–1968: Borac Čačak
- 1968–1969: Budućnost Titograd
- 1969–1970: OFK Beograd
- 1970–1971: Partizan
- 1972–1973: Borac Banja Luka
- 1973–1974: Vojvodina
- 1974–1976: Rijeka
- 1976–1978: Red Star Belgrade
- 1977: Yugoslavia (co-manager)
- 1978–1979: Budućnost Titograd
- 1980–1983: OFK Beograd
- 1983–1986: Red Star Belgrade
- 1986–1987: Aris Thessaloniki
- 1988: Al Ahli
- 1989–1990: OFK Beograd
- 1990: Spartak Subotica
- 1992–1995: Petro Atlético
- * Club domestic league appearances and goals

Gojko Zec (Serbian Cyrillic: Гојко Зец; 15 September 1935 – 3 November 1995) was a Yugoslav football manager and player.

== Playing career ==
Zec played for Voždovački during the 1964–65 Yugoslav Second League, making two appearances. He retired soon after and started his managerial career with the club.

== Managerial career ==
After a successful season as Voždovački manager, Zec took charge of fellow Yugoslav Second League side Borac Čačak in 1966, spending two years with the club. He subsequently led Budućnost Titograd to the Second League title in 1968–69, finishing as champions of Group South. Consequently, Zec was hired by OFK Beograd, becoming one of the youngest managers in the Yugoslav First League.

In July 1970, Zec was appointed as manager of Yugoslav runners-up Partizan, replacing Kiril Simonovski. He left the position in December 1971 following a disappointing first half of the season. Over the next few years, Zec served as manager of several other First League clubs, including Borac Banja Luka, Vojvodina, and Rijeka. He would take over as manager of Red Star Belgrade in July 1976, winning the Yugoslav championship in his first year.

In July 1983, Zec returned to Red Star as manager after five years, winning his second league title in his first comeback season. He also won the Yugoslav Cup in 1984–85, his third major trophy with the club over two spells. In the summer of 1986, Zec moved abroad to take charge of Greek side Aris Thessaloniki.

== Death ==
During his tenure as manager of Angolan club Petro Atlético, Zec was murdered on 3 November 1995 in Luanda.

== Honours ==
Budućnost Titograd

- Yugoslav Second League: 1968–69 (Group South)

Red Star Belgrade

- Yugoslav First League: 1976–77, 1983–84
- Yugoslav Cup: 1984–85

OFK Beograd

- Yugoslav Second League: 1979–80 (Group East)

Petro Atlético

- Girabola: 1993, 1994
- Taça de Angola: 1992, 1993, 1994
- Supertaça de Angola: 1993, 1994
