= Milan Živadinović =

Serbian football manager and player (1944–2021)

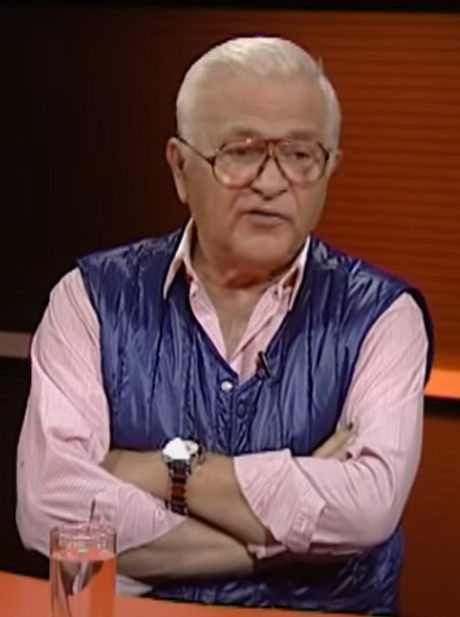
- Živadinović in 2018

Personal information
- Date of birth: 15 December 1944
- Place of birth: Belgrade, FS Serbia, DF Yugoslavia
- Date of death: 17 July 2021 (aged 76)
- Place of death: Belgrade, Serbia
- Position: Midfielder

Youth career
- Partizan
- Red Star Belgrade

Senior career*
Years	Team	Apps	(Gls)
1962–1964	Red Star Belgrade	2	(0)
1964–1965	Čelik Zenica	8	(1)
1965–1966	Vardar	23	(4)
1966–1968	Sloboda Titovo Užice	52	(13)
1968–1972	Red Star Belgrade	0	(0)
1968–1970	→ Rijeka (loan)	33	(8)
1970–1971	→ Crvenka (loan)	23	(2)
1972–1973	Novi Sad	14	(2)
1973–1974	Südwest Ludwigshafen		
Total		155	(30)

International career
1963	Yugoslavia U18	2	(0)

Managerial career
- 1974: Novi Sad (youth)
- 1975: Spartak Subotica
- 1975–1977: Novi Sad (assistant)
- 1977–1979: Red Star Belgrade (youth)
- 1979–1980: Rad
- 1980–1981: Sutjeska Nikšić
- 1981–1983: Sakaryaspor
- 1983–1984: Novi Sad
- 1985: Sakaryaspor
- 1986–1987: Budućnost Titograd
- 1987–1988: Radnički Niš
- 1988–1989: Priština
- 1989–1990: Al-Shabab
- 1990–1991: OFK Beograd
- 1991–1992: Budućnost Titograd
- 1992–1994: Red Star Belgrade
- 1994–1995: Apollon Limassol
- 1995–1997: FR Yugoslavia (assistant)
- 1996–1998: FR Yugoslavia U21
- 1998–1999: FR Yugoslavia
- 1999–2000: Al-Nassr
- 2000–2001: Iraq
- 2002: Obilić
- 2002: Ghana
- 2003–2004: Yemen
- 2004–2005: Saba Battery
- 2007: Changsha Ginde
- 2011: Myanmar
- * Club domestic league appearances and goals

Milan Živadinović (Serbian Cyrillic: Милан Живадиновић, pronounced [mǐlan ʒiʋadǐːnoʋitɕ]; 15 December 1944 – 17 July 2021) was a Serbian football manager and player.

== Club career ==
Živadinović made his senior debut with Red Star Belgrade in the Yugoslav First League at the age of 18, appearing in two games during the 1962–63 season. He later suffered a back injury that hindered his progress, going on to play for Čelik Zenica (1964–1965), Vardar (1965–1966), Sloboda Titovo Užice (1966–1968), Rijeka (1968–1970), and Crvenka (1970–1971), mostly in the Yugoslav Second League. After serving his compulsory military service, Živadinović spent some time with Novi Sad, before moving abroad to Südwest Ludwigshafen in West Germany.

== International career ==
In 1963, Živadinović was capped twice for Yugoslavia at under-18 level during the qualifiers for the 1963 UEFA European Under-18 Championship.

== Managerial career ==
Early into his managerial career, Živadinović spent one and a half years at the helm of Sutjeska Nikšić. He was also manager of Turkish club Sakaryaspor on two occasions during the 1980s. In between his two stints in Turkey, Živadinović was manager of Novi Sad in the Yugoslav Second League.

In 1986, Živadinović took over as manager of Yugoslav First League side Budućnost Titograd. He enjoyed success with the club, notably beating Hajduk Split and Dinamo Zagreb during the 1986–87 season. Under his guidance, Dejan Savićević went on to emerge as an integral member of the team and became a Yugoslavia international.

In 1992, following his second stint at Budućnost Titograd, Živadinović was hired as manager of Red Star Belgrade. He managed the club for two seasons, winning the 1992–93 FR Yugoslavia Cup by defeating arch-rivals Partizan on penalties.

In August 1998, Živadinović was appointed as manager of FR Yugoslavia, replacing Slobodan Santrač following the 1998 FIFA World Cup. He led the team at the start of the qualifying campaign for UEFA Euro 2000, taking the maximum nine points in his three games in charge. However, in July 1999, it was reported that Živadinović would take over as manager of Saudi club Al-Nassr after the conclusion of Yugoslavia's involvement in the Euro 2000 qualifiers. He was consequently dismissed from his job with the national team and replaced by Vujadin Boškov.

During the 2000s and early 2010s, Živadinović served as manager of several African and Asian nations, including Iraq, Ghana, Yemen, and Myanmar. He guided Iraq at the 2000 AFC Asian Cup, exiting the tournament in the quarter-finals.

== Death ==
Živadinović died on 17 July 2021. Serbia president Aleksandar Vučić issued a statement on Živadinović's death, expressing condolences to his family, friends and admirers.

== Honours ==
Red Star Belgrade

- FR Yugoslavia Cup: 1992–93
