= Dejan Đurđević =

Serbian footballer and manager

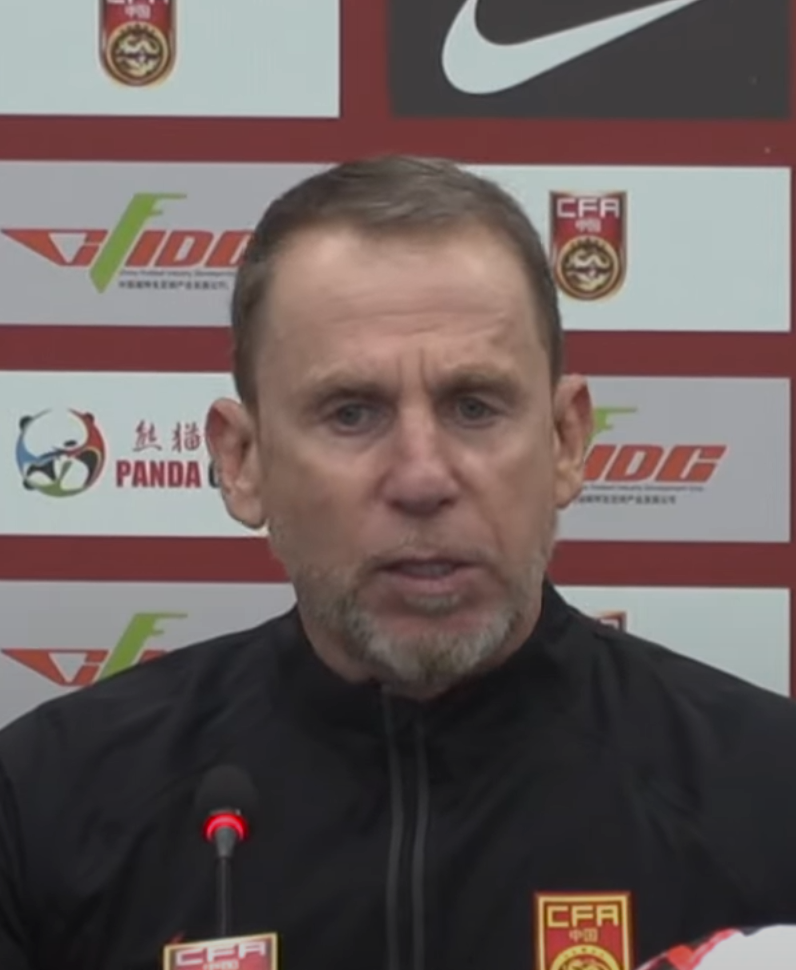

Personal information
- Date of birth: 4 July 1967 (age 59)
- Place of birth: Lazarevac, SR Serbia, Yugoslavia
- Position: Midfielder

Team information
- Current team: China (caretaker manager), China U-19 (manager)

Senior career*
Years	Team	Apps	(Gls)
- Kolubara
1989–1993	OFK Beograd	91	(3)
1994	Apollon Smyrni	13	(1)
1994–1995	OFK Beograd	27	(3)
1995–1997	Čukarički	27	(1)
1997	Vasalunds IF	22	(2)
1998–2000	OFK Beograd	40	(2)
Total		220	(12)

Managerial career
- OFK Beograd (youth)
- 2007–2008: Serbia U17
- 2008–2009: Čukarički
- 2009–2011: OFK Beograd
- 2011–2012: Pakhtakor Tashkent
- 2012–2013: Radnički Kragujevac
- 2014–2015: OFK Beograd
- 2018–2019: Zemun
- 2019: Navbahor
- 2021–2022: Kolubara
- 2022: Kolubara
- 2023: China U-23
- 2024–: China U-20
- 2025: China (interim)
- * Club domestic league appearances and goals

Dejan "Švaba" Đurđević (Serbian Cyrillic: Дејан Шваба Ђурђевић; born 4 July 1967) is a Serbian football manager and former player. He is the manager of China U-20.

== Playing career ==
Born in Lazarevac, Đurđević started out at his local club Kolubara, before moving to OFK Beograd in the 1989–90 season. He later moved abroad to Sweden and joined Vasalunds IF. In 1998, Đurđević returned to OFK Beograd, spending the next two seasons at the club.

== Managerial career ==
After hanging up his boots, Đurđević started working in the youth system at OFK Beograd. He subsequently took charge of the Serbia U17s and led the team to the 2008 UEFA European Under-17 Championship. In December 2008, Đurđević was appointed manager of Čukarički.

In June 2009, Đurđević became manager of OFK Beograd. He left the club after two and a half years and moved abroad to Uzbekistan, being appointed manager at Pakhtakor Tashkent in December 2011.

In October 2012, Đurđević took charge at Radnički Kragujevac. He was released by the club in April 2013, following poor results. In June 2014, Đurđević returned to OFK Beograd.

On 24 February 2023, Đurđević was appointed as new head coach of China U-23.

On 27 June 2025, following the leaving of head coach Branko Ivanković, Chinese Football Association appointed Đurđević as the caretaker manager of China national football team, to attend the upcoming 2025 EAFF E-1 Football Championship.
