= Mile Kos =

Serbian coach and sportswriter (1925–2014)

Personal information
- Full name: Miodrag Kos
- Date of birth: 20 September 1925
- Place of birth: Belgrade, Kingdom of Serbs, Croats and Slovenes
- Date of death: 1 September 2014 (aged 88)
- Place of death: Belgrade, Serbia
- Position: Goalkeeper

Senior career*
Years	Team	Apps	(Gls)
1939	SK Jugoslavija		
- Red Star Belgrade
- Metalac Belgrade
1951	Proleter Zrenjanin		

Managerial career
- 1963: OFK Beograd
- 1964–1965: Partizan (assistant)
- 1965–1966: PAOK
- * Club domestic league appearances and goals

Miodrag "Mile" Kos (Serbian Cyrillic: Миодраг Миле Кос; 20 September 1925 – 1 September 2014) was a Serbian footballer, coach and sportswriter.
