= Simo Krunić =

Bosnian football player and manager (born 1967)

Personal information
- Date of birth: 13 January 1967 (age 59)
- Place of birth: Sarajevo, SFR Yugoslavia
- Height: 1.83 m (6 ft 0 in)
- Position: Midfielder

Senior career*
Years	Team	Apps	(Gls)
1987	Sarajevo	3	(0)
1988	Famos Hrasnica	12	(1)
1988–1992	Željezničar	50	(2)
1992–1994	OFK Beograd	59	(7)
1994–1995	Marbella	44	(3)
1996	Pohang Steelers	6	(2)
1997	Čukarički	8	(0)
1997–1998	AEL	32	(4)
1998–1999	ILTEX Lykoi	47	(2)
2000	Panetolikos	15	(3)
Total		268	(24)

Managerial career
- 2003–2006: OFK Beograd (assistant)
- 2006–2007: BASK
- 2006–2007: Serbia (assistant)
- 2008: Željezničar
- 2009: OFK Beograd
- 2010: Čukarički
- 2011: Inđija
- 2011–2013: Jagodina
- 2013: Dalian Aerbin
- 2014–2015: Jagodina
- 2017–2018: Radnik Surdulica
- 2018–2019: Čukarički
- 2019: Serbia (assistant)
- 2019: Radnički Niš
- 2019–2020: Radnik Surdulica
- 2022: Radnik Surdulica
- 2023–2025: OFK Beograd
- * Club domestic league appearances and goals

Simo Krunić (Serbian Cyrillic: Симо Крунић; born 13 January 1967) is a Bosnian-Serbian professional football manager and former footballer.

== Playing career ==
In the late 1980s, Krunić played for the two biggest clubs in Bosnia and Herzegovina, Sarajevo and Željezničar, while the teams competed in the Yugoslav First League. In between the two clubs, he also played for Famos Hrasnica. He subsequently moved to OFK Beograd due to the outbreak of the Bosnian War, spending two seasons with the Romantičari (1992–1994).

During his footballing career, Krunić also played professionally in Spain, South Korea (he won the 1996 Korean FA Cup with Pohang Steelers) and Greece.

== Managerial career ==
Together with Risto Vidaković, Krunić served as assistant to Spaniard Javier Clemente at the helm of the Serbia national team during the UEFA Euro 2008 qualifying. He was later manager of BASK, Željezničar, OFK Beograd, Čukarički, Inđija, Jagodina (on two occasions), Dalian Yifang and Radnik Surdulica. In May 2013, he won the 2012–13 Serbian Cup with Jagodina.

In May 2018, Krunić for a second time in his career took over the managerial job of Čukarički. Krunić had success with Čukarički, getting the club to 4th place in the 2018–19 Serbian SuperLiga and also qualifying it to the 2019–20 UEFA Europa League qualifying rounds. He decided to leave Čukarički on 25 May 2019.

On 11 February 2019, it was announced that Krunić became a new member of the Serbia national team coaching staff and was appointed as a coach. He left the national team later that day.

On 25 June 2019, he became the new manager of Radnički Niš, succeeding Nenad Lalatović on the position. He was sacked in August 2019, but shortly after in October, returned to manage Radnik Surdulica.

== Managerial statistics ==
As of match played 24 December 2025 »

Managerial record by team and tenure
Team	From	To	Record				
Team	From	To	P	W	D	L	Win %
BASK	July 2006	June 2007	30	14	4	12	46.67
Željezničar Sarajevo	20 January 2008	24 November 2008	12	5	3	4	41.67
OFK Beograd	13 April 2009	13 June 2009	7	1	2	4	14.29
Čukarički	1 February 2010	12 August 2010	15	7	3	5	46.67
Inđija	11 April 2011	30 June 2011	9	4	1	4	44.44
Jagodina	1 July 2011	2 June 2013	70	35	15	20	50.00
Dalian	3 June 2013	5 December 2013	22	9	6	7	40.91
Jagodina	18 September 2014	30 June 2015	30	12	4	14	40.00
Radnik Surdulica	22 March 2017	30 June 2018	43	16	9	18	37.21
Čukarički	1 July 2018	25 May 2019	39	19	12	8	48.72
Radnički Niš	24 June 2019	19 August 2019	7	3	2	2	42.86
Radnik Surdulica	30 October 2019	25 August 2020	24	6	5	13	25.00
Radnik Surdulica	31 October 2020	31 December 2020	3	1	0	2	33.33
OFK Beograd	1 January 2023	1 January 2026	95	43	19	33	45.26
Total			405	175	85	145	43.21

== Honours ==
=== Player ===
Pohang Stellers

- Korean FA Cup: 1996

=== Manager ===
Jagodina

- Serbian Cup: 2012–13

OFK Beograd

- Serbian League Belgrade: 2022–23
- Serbian First League:

2023-24
