= Dragoljub Bekvalac =

Serbian football manager and player

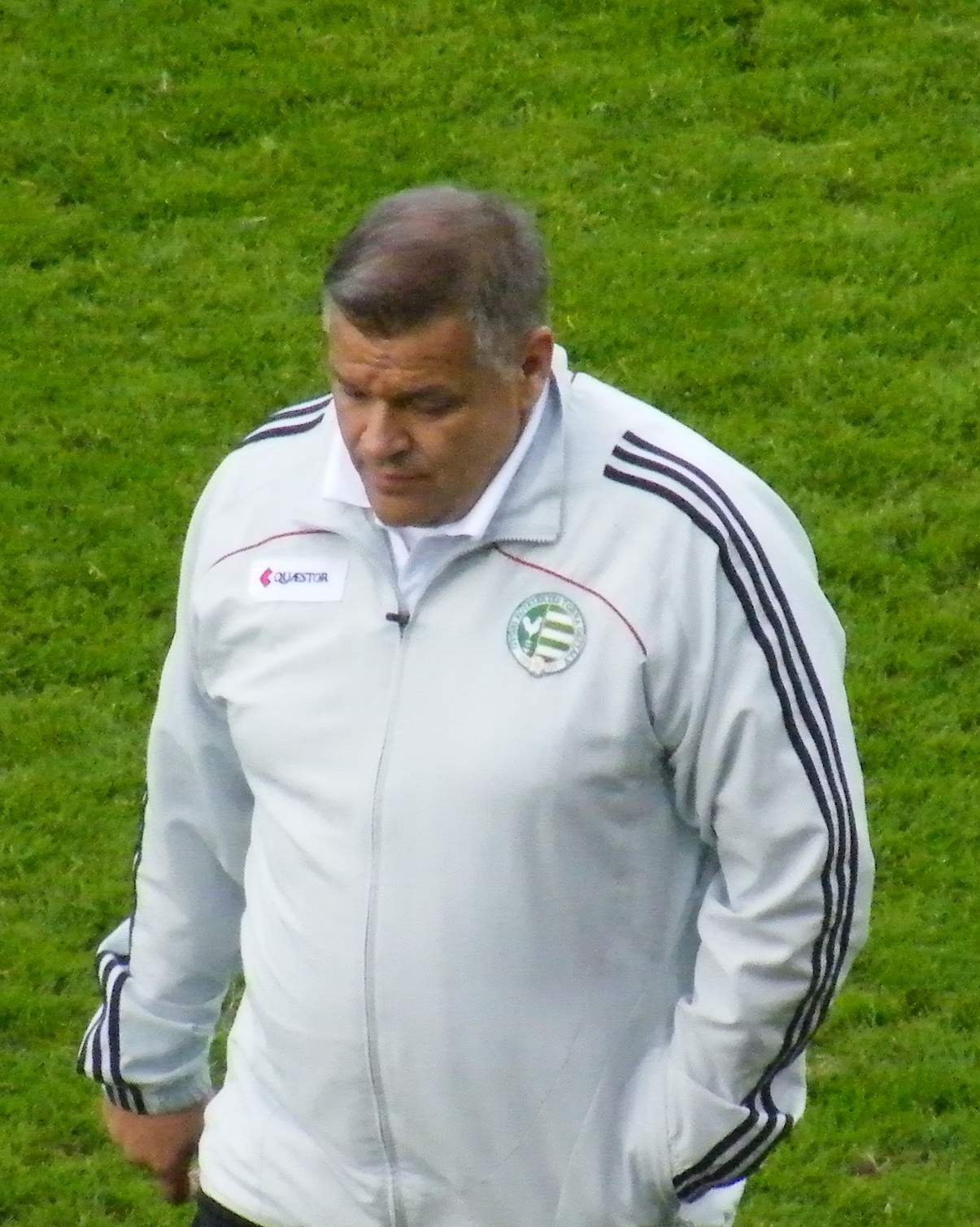
- Bekvalac with Győr in 2009

Personal information
- Date of birth: 14 July 1952 (age 74)
- Place of birth: Pristina, PR Serbia, FPR Yugoslavia
- Position: Defender

Youth career
- Vojvodina

Senior career*
Years	Team	Apps	(Gls)
1972–1973	Radnički Sombor		
1975–1977	FK Novi Sad	59	(3)
1977–1978	Teteks	29	(7)
1978–1980	FK Novi Sad	19	(2)
1980–1983	Vojvodina	65	(6)
1984	AIK Bačka Topola	11	(1)
1984–1986	Rudar Ljubija	33	(3)
Total		216+	(22+)

Managerial career
- 1992–1993: FK Novi Sad
- 1993–1996: Hajduk Kula
- 1996: Vojvodina
- 1997: Litex Lovech
- 1998–1999: Sutjeska Nikšić
- 1999–2000: Olimpik-Beroe
- 2000: Vojvodina
- 2000–2001: Vojvodina
- 2001–2003: OFK Beograd
- 2004: OFK Beograd
- 2004–2005: Obilić
- 2005–2006: Hajduk Kula
- 2006–2007: Bežanija
- 2007–2008: Rabotnički
- 2008: Vojvodina
- 2008–2009: Győr
- 2010–2011: Hajduk Kula
- 2012: Novi Pazar
- 2013: Radnički 1923
- 2013–2014: Radnički Niš
- 2014: Radnički 1923
- 2015: OFK Beograd
- 2016: Zemun
- * Club domestic league appearances and goals

Dragoljub Bekvalac (Serbian Cyrillic: Драгољуб Беквалац; born 14 July 1952) is a Serbian retired football manager and player.

== Playing career ==
After coming through the youth system at Vojvodina, Bekvalac made his senior debut with Radnički Sombor in the early 1970s. He subsequently played for Novi Sad and Teteks in the Yugoslav Second League. In 1980, Bekvalac was signed by his parent club Vojvodina. He spent three-and-a-half seasons there, making 65 appearances and scoring six goals in the Yugoslav First League.

== Managerial career ==
After hanging up his boots, Bekvalac was manager of numerous clubs in his homeland, most notably Vojvodina and OFK Beograd. He also worked professionally in Bulgaria and Hungary.

== Personal life ==
Bekvalac is the father of pop singer Nataša Bekvalac.

== Honours ==
Rabotnički

- Macedonian First League: 2007–08
- Macedonian Cup: 2007–08
