= Žarko Mihajlović =

Yugoslav football coach (1920–1986)

Personal information
- Date of birth: 4 March 1920
- Place of birth: Neuzina, Kingdom of Serbs, Croats and Slovenes
- Date of death: 16 September 1986 (aged 66)
- Place of death: Belgrade, SFR Yugoslavia
- Position: Centre-half

Senior career*
Years	Team	Apps	(Gls)
- BSK Beograd

Managerial career
- 1951: Red Star Belgrade
- 1952–1953: Red Star Belgrade
- 1953–1955: Fenerbahçe
- 1955: Turkey
- 1958–1959: Ethnikos Piraeus
- 1959–1961: PAOK
- 1961–1963: Doxa Drama
- 1963–1965: Apollon Kalamarias
- 1965–1966: Ethnikos Piraeus
- 1966: Karşıyaka
- 1967–1969: OFK Beograd
- 1972–1975: Qadsia
- 1977–1978: Qadsia
- * Club domestic league appearances and goals

Žarko Mihajlović (4 March 1920 – 16 September 1986) was a Yugoslav football coach who managed Red Star Belgrade, OFK Beograd, PAOK FC, Fenerbahçe, Ethnikos Piraeus, Apollon Kalamarias, Doxa Dramas, Karşıyaka, Qadsia SC, and the Turkey national team. With Red Star he won first two league title for the club in 1951 and 1953.

He played for BSK Beograd.
