= Milovan Ćirić =

Serbian football manager (1918–1986)

Personal information
- Date of birth: 12 February 1918
- Place of birth: Belgrade, Austrian-occupied Serbia
- Date of death: 14 October 1986 (aged 68)
- Place of death: Belgrade, SR Serbia, SFR Yugoslavia
- Position: Midfielder

Senior career*
Years	Team	Apps	(Gls)
1938–1940	SK Jugoslavija	26	(0)
1945–1947	Red Star Belgrade		
1947–1948	Partizan		

Managerial career
- 1951–1953: BSK
- 1953–1954: Partizan
- 1954: Yugoslavia
- 1954–1957: Red Star Belgrade
- 1957–1958: Lazio
- 1959–1961: Hajduk Split
- 1961–1963: OFK Beograd
- 1963–1964: Hajduk Split
- 1964–1965: OFK Beograd
- 1965–1968: Israel
- 1968–1969: Beşiktaş
- 1969–1971: Aris
- 1973–1974: Yugoslavia
- 1974–1975: Valencia
- 1975–1976: Red Star Belgrade
- 1976: Iraklis Thessaloniki
- 1977: Beşiktaş
- 1978: Aris
- 1983–1985: India
- * Club domestic league appearances and goals

Milovan Ćirić (Serbian Cyrillic: Милован Ћирић; 12 February 1918 – 14 October 1986) was a Yugoslav football coach and player. He was the last player to captain SK Jugoslavija and the first captain of Red Star Belgrade (1945–1947). In June 1947 Ćirić moved to city rivals Partizan (1947–1948). After finishing his career as a player, Ćirić embarked on a coaching career, firstly as the youth team manager for Partizan (1948–1951).

== Managerial career ==
Throughout his long career he coached OFK Beograd (1951–1953), Partizan (1953–1954), the Yugoslavian national team (from May to October 1954 as part of a five-man commission along with Branko Pešić, Aleksandar Tirnanić, Leo Lemešić and Franjo Wölfl as well as from December 1973 to July 1974 as part of another five-man commission featuring Miljan Miljanić, Milan Ribar, Sulejman Rebac and Tomislav Ivić), Red Star Belgrade (1954–1957, 1975–1976), Lazio (1957–1958), Hajduk Split (1958–1961, 1963–1964), OFK Beograd (1961–1963, 1964–1965), the Israel national football team (1965–1968), Beşiktaş (1968–1969), Aris (1969–1971), Valencia (1974–1975), the India national team (1984–85), amongst others.
