= List of Yugoslavia international footballers =

This is a list of all football players that have played for the Yugoslavia national football team that represented the Kingdom of Serbs, Croats and Slovenes, the Kingdom of Yugoslavia and SFR Yugoslavia in the years of 1920–1992.

Ordered alphabetically by the surname followed by the years of their appearances and number of matches and goals.

== A ==
- Jovan Aćimović (1968–1976) 55/3
- Đuka Agić (1930–1930) 1/0
- Rajko Aleksić (1968–1968) 2/0
- Jovan Anđelković (1965–1966) 2/0
- Slobodan Anđelković (1937–1937) 1/0
- Andrija Anković (1960–1962) 8/1
- Boško Antić (1968–1968) 1/0
- Radomir Antić (1973–1973) 1/0
- Sava Antić (1956–1956) 5/2
- Milan Antolković (1937–1939) 8/1
- Zoran Antonijević (1970–1972) 8/0
- Milorad Arsenijević (1927–1936) 52/0
- Zijad Arslanagić (1965–1965) 1/0
- Mustafa Arslanović (1987–1987) 1/0
- Aljoša Asanović (1987–1988) 3/0
- Aleksandar Atanacković (1946–1950) 15/1
- Radojko Avramović (1978–1978) 1/0

== B ==
- Dragutin Babić (1921–1931) 10/2
- Nikola Babić (1928–1932) 3/0
- Boban Babunski (1991–1991) 2/0
- Edin Bahtić (1984–1985) 2/0
- Dušan Bajević (1970–1977) 37/29
- Mane Bajić (1966–1969) 2/0
- Milenko Bajić (1970–1970) 1/0
- Božo Bakota (1978–1978) 1/0
- Mirsad Baljić (1984–1990) 29/3
- Ivica Barbarić (1988–1988) 1/0
- Slobodan Batričević (1983–1983) 1/0
- Zoran Batrović (1984–1984) 1/0
- Mehmed Baždarević (1983–1992) 54/4
- Vladimir Beara (1950–1959) 59/0
- Radoslav Bečejac (1965–1970) 12/0
- Zvonko Bego (1961–1961) 6/2
- Ivica Bek (1927–1931) 7/4
- Jovan Beleslin (1939–1939) 1/0
- Miloš Beleslin (1928–1930) 8/1
- Bruno Belin (1952–1959) 25/0
- Rudolf Belin (1963–1969) 29/6
- Ivan Belošević (1933–1939) 11/0
- Stevan Bena (1959–1961) 7/0
- Ljubo Benčić (1924–1927) 5/2
- Aleksandar Benko (1949–1949) 1/0
- Ivan Benković (1923–1923) 1/0
- Dragiša Binić (1990–1991) 3/1
- Ibrahim Biogradlić (1956–1956) 1/0
- August Bivec (1933–1933) 1/0
- Nenad Bjeković (1968–1976) 22/4
- Filip Blašković (1969–1969) 1/0
- Zvonimir Boban (1988–1991) 7/1
- Stjepan Bobek (1946–1956) 63/38
- Srećko Bogdan (1977–1983) 11/0
- Vladislav Bogićević (1971–1977) 23/2
- Zoran Bojović (1983–1983) 2/0
- Mario Boljat (1977–1978) 5/0
- Antun Bonačić (1924–1931) 8/2
- Mirko Bonačić (1924–1928) 6/3
- Petar Borota (1977–1978) 4/0
- Vujadin Boškov (1951–1958) 57/0
- Miroslav Bošković (1968–1972) 6/0
- Branko Bošnjak (1983–1983) 1/0
- Radivoj Božić (1934–1934) 1/0
- Boban Božović (1983–1983) 1/0
- Vojin Božović (1936–1941) 8/5
- Blagoje Bratić (1972–1972) 3/0
- Dragutin Bratulić (1934–1935) 3/0
- Mirko Braun (1963–1963) 3/0
- Marijan Brncić (1962–1967) 10/0
- Branko Brnović (1989–) 27/3
- Dragoljub Brnović (1987–1990) 25/1
- Božo Broketa (1947–1948) 3/0
- Miroslav Brozović (1940–1948) 17/0
- Ivica Brzić (1966–1966) 1/0
- Josip Bukal (1966–1974) 24/10
- Ivan Buljan (1973–1981) 36/2
- Miloš Bursać (1985–1985) 2/0

== C ==
- Zvonimir Cimermančić (1940–1948) 9/3
- Slavin Cindrić (1920–1928) 5/3
- Jovan Cokić (1952–1955) 2/1
- Tomislav Crnković (1952–1960) 51/0
- Nikica Cukrov (1977–1983) 14/0
- Rudolf Cvek (1968–1969) 6/0
- Borislav Cvetković (1983–1988) 11/1
- Zvjezdan Cvetković (1982–1987) 9/1

== Č ==
- Ratomir Čabrić (1938–1938) 1/0
- Željko Čajkovski (1947–1951) 19/12
- Zlatko Čajkovski (1946–1955) 55/7
- Vlado Čapljić (1984–1985) 4/0
- Srđan Čebinac (1964–1964) 1/0
- Zvezdan Čebinac (1959–1964) 20/4
- Marijan Čerček (1969–1969) 1/0
- Ratko Čolić (1949–1951) 14/0
- Vladimir Čonč (1956–1956) 1/0
- Josip Čop (1984–1984) 2/0
- Milan Čop (1963–1964) 10/0
- Bartol Čulić (1931–1935) 10/0

== Ć ==
- Saša Ćurčić (1991–1998) 14/1
- Edin Ćurić (1987–1987) 1/0
- Ivan Ćurković (1963–1970) 19/0

== D ==
- Milan Damjanović (1967–1968) 7/0
- Eugen Dasović (1923–1927) 10/0
- Fahrija Dautbegović (1969–1970) 2/0
- Sreten Davidović (1953–1953) 1/0
- Sergije Demić (1932–1933) 4/0
- Damir Desnica (1978–1978) 1/1
- Miroslav Dešković (1931–1931) 1/0
- Stjepan Deverić (1982–1984) 6/0
- Branislav Dimitrijević (1928–1933) 5/0
- Rudolf Dobrijević (1930–1930) 1/0
- Kiril Dojčinovski (1968–1970) 6/0
- Zlatko Dračić (1965–1965) 1/0
- Milorad Dragićević (1926–1928) 2/0
- Prvoslav Dragićević (1939–1940) 6/0
- Božidar Drenovac (1947–1947) 1/0
- Branislav Drobnjak (1983–1983) 1/0
- Ernest Dubac (1938–1941) 14/0
- Artur Dubravčić (1920–1924) 9/1
- Ratomir Dujković (1971–1971) 4/0
- Petar Dujmović (1924–1924) 1/0
- Vladimir Durković (1959–1966) 50/0
- Dionizije Dvornić (1953–1954) 6/1

== Dž ==
- Dragan Džajić (1964–1979) 85/23
- Jasmin Džeko (1983–1983) 2/1
- Vilson Džoni (1974–1978) 4/0

== Đ ==
- Predrag Đajić (1949–1953) 17/0
- Svetozar Đanić (1940–1941) 3/0
- Miloš Đelmas (1987–1987) 1/0
- Momčilo Đokić (1930–1936) 13/0
- Boriša Đorđević (1976–1977) 5/0
- Borivoje Đorđević (1967–1971) 9/0
- Ljubiša Đorđević (1928–1931) 5/0
- Milovan Đorić (1969–1969) 1/0
- Miroslav Đukić (1991–2001) 48/2
- Vladislav Đukić (1988–1988) 2/1
- Vladeta Đurić (1926–1926) 1/0
- Boško Đurovski (1982–1989) 4/0
- Milko Đurovski (1984–1985) 6/2

== E ==
- Marko Elsner (1984–1988) 14/0

== F ==
- Mirsad Fazlagić (1963–1968) 19/0
- Antuna Kolnago Ferante (1929–1929) 1/0
- Fric Ferderber (1922–1922) 1/0
- Asim Ferhatović (1961–1961) 1/0
- Nijaz Ferhatović (1982–1982) 2/0
- Zoran Filipović (1971–1977) 13/2
- Vladimir Firm (1947–1949) 3/0
- Dragutin Fridrih (1922–1927) 9/0

== G ==
- Ivan Gajer (1932–1937) 28/0
- Milan Galić (1959–1965) 51/37
- Petar Georgijevski (1984–1984) 1/0
- Franjo Giler (1926–1932) 13/3
- Franjo Glaser (1933–1940) 35/0
- Svetislav Glišović (1932–1940) 21/9
- Ivan Golac (1976–1976) 1/0
- Vinko Golob (1948–1948) 1/0
- Nenad Gračan (1984–1986) 10/2
- Branko Gračanin (1968–1970) 10/1
- Ivan Granec (1920–1920) 1/0
- Mirko Grdenić (1925–1925) 1/0
- Ivan Gudelj (1980–1986) 33/3
- Dragan Gugleta (1965–1966) 8/2

== H ==
- Džemal Hadžiabdić (1974–1978) 20/0
- Enver Hadžiabdić (1970–1974) 11/0
- Faruk Hadžibegić (1982–1992) 61/6
- Ismet Hadžić (1979–1983) 5/0
- Vahid Halilhodžić (1976–1985) 15/8
- Sulejman Halilović (1983–1984) 12/1
- Mustafa Hasanagić (1965–1967) 5/0
- Jusuf Hatunić (1972–1978) 8/0
- Antun Herceg (1950–1957) 12/2
- Bernard Higl (1934–1939) 24/0
- Ivan Hitrec (1929–1939) 14/10
- Rudolf Hitrec (1926–1926) 1/0
- Ivan Hlevnjak (1969–1970) 3/0
- Edvard Hočevar (1950–1950) 1/1
- Dragan Holcer (1965–1974) 52/0
- Ivica Horvat (1946–1956) 60/0
- Janoš Horvat (1929–1929) 1/0
- Vladimir-Drago Horvat (1949–1949) 1/0
- Idriz Hošić (1968–1968) 2/0
- Branislav Hrnjiček (1929–1930) 5/1
- Miloš Hrstić (1978–1982) 10/0
- Mustafa Hukić (1977–1977) 5/0

== I ==
- Zvonko Ivezić (1975–1976) 4/2
- Milutin Ivković (1925–1934) 39/0
- Tomislav Ivković (1983–1991) 38/0
- Aleksandar Ivoš (1962–1962) 3/0

== J ==
- Lajoš Jakovetić (1949–1949) 4/0
- Dragan Jakovljević (1987–1989) 8/3
- Milovan Jakšić (1930–1934) 9/0
- Čedomir Janevski (1987–1987) 2/0
- Rajko Janjanin (1979–1980) 2/0
- Božidar Janković (1972–1972) 2/0
- Milan Janković (1986–1989) 12/1
- Milorad Janković (1966–1966) 1/0
- Slobodan Janković (1975–1975) 1/0
- Marijan Jantoljak (1966–1966) 2/0
- Robert Jarni (1990–1991) 7/1
- Ešref Jašarević (1977–1977) 2/0
- Zvonko Jazbec (1934–1938) 10/0
- Ivan Jazbinšek (1938–1941) 7/0
- Živorad Jeftić (1964–1969) 16/0
- Zoran Jelikić (1976–1983) 8/0
- Dražan Jerković (1960–1964) 21/11
- Jure Jerković (1970–1981) 43/6
- Ive Jerolimov (1980–1982) 6/0
- Miodrag Ješić (1982–1984) 8/2
- Jovan Jezerkić (1947–1947) 4/5
- Stanoje Jocić (1952–1954) 4/2
- Slaviša Jokanović (1991–) 64/10
- Dragan Jovanović (1923–1928) 8/4
- Mija Jovanović (1930–1931) 3/0
- Miodrag Jovanović (1947–1950) 25/0
- Nikola Jovanović (1979–1982) 7/0
- Milan Jovin (1980–1982) 4/0
- Davor Jozić (1984–1991) 27/2
- Vladimir Jugović (1991–) 41/3
- Željko Jurčić (1976–1976) 1/0
- Ante Jurić (1959–1959) 1/0
- Goran Jurić (1988–1989) 4/0
- Predrag Jurić (1986–1987) 2/0
- Fahrudin Jusufi (1959–1967) 55/0

== K ==
- Ratko Kacijan (1946–1946) 1/0
- Sead Kajtaz (1986–1986) 1/0
- Tomislav Kaloperović (1957–1961) 6/1
- Dragan Kanatlarovski (1990–1990) 1/0
- Mirza Kapetanović (1983–1985) 6/0
- Stanislav Karasi (1973–1974) 10/4
- Vlado Kasalo (1987–1987) 1/0
- Ivan Katalinić (1977–1978) 13/0
- Josip Katalinski (1972–1977) 41/10
- Srečko Katanec (1983–1990) 31/5
- Ilija Katić (1968–1969) 4/0
- Mihalj Kečkeš (1937–1938) 2/0
- Ante Kesić (1924–1924) 1/0
- Hugo Kinert (1921–1922) 2/0
- Vladimir Klaić (1953–1953) 1/0
- Nikica Klinčarski (1980–1983) 8/1
- Tomislav Knez (1960–1961) 14/8
- Bruno Knežević (1938–1938) 1/0
- Miodrag Knežević (1966–1967) 2/0
- Zdenko Kobeščak (1963–1964) 2/0
- Aleksandar Kocić (1994–2001) 22/0
- Slavko Kodrnja (1933–1933) 4/4
- Meho Kodro (1991–1992) 2/0
- Andreja Kojić (1920–1920) 1/0
- Ljubomir Kokeza (1946–1952) 2/0
- Mirko Kokotović (1931–1939) 23/4
- Božidar Kolaković (1951–1951) 1/0
- Mladen Koščak (1956–1956) 4/0
- Borivoje Kostić (1956–1964) 33/26
- Abid Kovačević (1977–1977) 2/0
- Vladimir Kovačević (1960–1965) 13/2
- Frane Kovačić (1932–1933) 5/0
- Aleksandar Kozlina (1960–1961) 9/0
- Vladimir Kragić (1930–1934) 6/4
- Branko Kralj (1954–1955) 3/0
- Zlatko Kranjčar (1977–1983) 11/3
- Miodrag Krivokapić (1987–1988) 5/0
- Petar Krivokuća (1972–1974) 13/0
- Srboljub Krivokuća (1956–1961) 7/0
- Mirko Križ (1925–1929) 2/0
- Zlatko Krmpotić (1980–1982) 8/0
- Jozo Krnić (1947–1947) 1/1
- Dobrosav Krstić (1955–1960) 30/1
- Mišo Krstićević (1979–1980) 7/1
- Vinko Kuci (Vinko Cuzzi) (1965–1966) 8/0
- Andrija Kujundžić (1921–1922) 2/0
- Branko Kunst (1926–1930) 7/0
- Mirko Kurir (1924–1924) 2/0
- Miodrag Kustudić (1977–1978) 3/0

== L ==
- Dražen Ladić (1991–1991) 2/0
- Vladimir Lajnert (1926–1929) 5/2
- Stjepan Lamza (1963–1967) 7/0
- Vojin Lazarević (1964–1969) 5/1
- Gustav Lehner (1931–1940) 44/0
- Dragoje Leković (1988–1998) 14/0
- Leo Lemešić (1929–1932) 5/3
- Lazar Lemić (1964–1964) 2/0
- August Lešnik (1937–1940) 10/4
- Pavao Lev (Pavao Löw) (1933–1933) 3/0
- Luka Lipošinović (1954–1960) 13/3
- Đorđe Lojančić (1936–1937) 2/0
- Dragutin Lojen (1946–1946) 3/0
- Petar Lončarević (1930–1930) 2/0
- Ljubomir Lovrić (1939–1948) 5/0
- Stevan Luburić (1925–1930) 6/1
- Vladimir Lukarić (1961–1965) 6/1
- Miroslav Lukić (1930–1934) 8/0
- Vladan Lukić (1991–1998) 6/2
- Slavko Luštica (1951–1952) 3/0

== Lj ==
- Milan Ljubenović (1954–1955) 4/0
- Živan Ljukovčan (1985–1986) 4/0

== M ==
- Rodoljub Malenčić (1922–1922) 1/0
- Dragan Mance (1983–1983) 4/0
- Petar Manola (1939–1941) 9/0
- Lav Mantula (1954–1954) 1/0
- Dušan Maravić (1960–1960) 7/3
- Remija Marcikić (1921–1921) 1/0
- Enver Marić (1972–1976) 32/0
- Zoran Marić (1983–1983) 2/0
- Sava Marinković (1928–1930) 3/0
- Blagoje Marjanović (1926–1938) 57/36
- Mare Marjanović (1924–1926) 6/0
- Nikola Marjanović (1933–1933) 1/0
- Dušan Marković (1932–1932) 1/0
- Predrag Marković (1954–1954) 1/1
- Vladimir Marković (1961–1962) 16/0
- Slobodan Marović (1987–1989) 4/0
- Egidio Martinović (1927–1927) 1/0
- Anđelko Marušić (1930–1935) 16/0
- Florijan Matekalo (1940–1940) 1/0
- Vladimir Matijević (1980–1984) 3/0
- Frane Matošić (1938–1953) 16/6
- Jozo Matošić (1934–1940) 24/0
- Željko Matuš (1960–1962) 13/5
- Ivan Medarić (1937–1939) 3/0
- Vojislav Melić (1962–1967) 27/2
- Rizah Mešković (1972–1972) 1/0
- Branislav Mihajlović (1959–1960) 8/4
- Dragoslav Mihajlović (1930–1930) 4/0
- Ljubomir Mihajlović (1966–1968) 6/0
- Prvoslav Mihajlović (1946–1950) 13/6
- Radmilo Mihajlović (1986–1989) 6/1
- Siniša Mihajlović (1991–) 63/9
- Maksimilijan Mihalčić (1925–1931) 18/0
- Predrag Mijatović (1989–2003) 73/27
- Marko Mikačić (1930–1931) 3/0
- Jovan Miladinović (1959–1964) 17/0
- Darko Milanič (1991–1992) 5/0
- Zoran Milenković (1966–1966) 1/0
- Anđelo Milevoj (1966–1966) 4/0
- Đorđe Milić (1964–1964) 1/0
- Goran Miljanović (1983–1988) 4/1
- Ivica Miljković (1975–1975) 1/0
- Branko Miljuš (1984–1988) 14/0
- Goran Milojević (1988–1989) 2/0
- Cvijan Milošević (1988–1988) 1/0
- Slavko Milošević (1930–1934) 4/0
- Sima Milovanov (1951–1954) 4/0
- Šime Milutin (1939–1939) 1/0
- Miloš Milutinović (1953–1958) 33/16
- Ante Miročević (1978–1980) 6/2
- Rajko Mitić (1946–1957) 59/32
- Milorad Mitrović (1928–1935) 3/0
- Marko Mlinarić (1983–1988) 17/1
- Sokrat Mojsov (1964–1966) 3/0
- Zvonko Monsider (1946–1947) 7/0
- Mitar Mrkela (1982–1986) 5/1
- Srđan Mrkušić (1941–1950) 11/0
- Muhamed Mujić (1956–1962) 32/17
- Fikret Mujkić (1968–1970) 5/1
- Husref Musemić (1983–1983) 1/0
- Vahidin Musemić (1968–1970) 17/9
- Džemaludin Mušović (1965–1968) 10/2
- Džemal Mustedanagić (1980–1980) 1/0
- Dragan Mutibarić (1969–1970) 10/0
- Dražen Mužinić (1974–1979) 32/1

== N ==
- Mihajlo Načević (1926–1926) 1/0
- Petar Nadoveza (1967–1967) 1/0
- Dragutin Najdanović (1928–1930) 4/1
- Ilija Najdoski (1990–1992) 11/1
- Velimir Naumović (1963–1964) 3/0
- Dušan Nedič (1988-1988)
- Stevan Neštički (1967–1967) 1/0
- Petar Nikezić (1971–1973) 3/0
- Dušan Nikolić (1976–1977) 4/1
- Jovica Nikolić (1985–1985) 1/0
- Milorad Nikolić (1940–1941) 3/0
- Slavoljub Nikolić (1982–1982) 2/0
- Žarko Nikolić (1959–1961) 9/0
- Džoni Novak (1991–1992) 4/0
- Marjan Novak (1967–1967) 1/0
- Martin Novoselac (1975–1976) 4/0

== O ==
- Brane Oblak (1970–1977) 46/6
- Milovan Obradović (1977–1977) 1/0
- Tihomir Ognjanov (1950–1956) 28/7
- Ljubomir Ognjanović (1958–1958) 1/0
- Radivoj Ognjanović (1957–1959) 5/1
- Fahrudin Omerović (1989–1992) 8/0
- Ivica Osim (1964–1969) 16/8
- Stevan Ostojić (1964–1971) 2/0
- Ivan Ožegović (1947–1947) 2/0

== P ==
- Božidar Pajević (1954–1954) 1/0
- Miloš Pajević (1949–1949) 3/3
- Bela Palfi (1948–1951) 3/0
- Andrej Panadić (1989–1989) 3/0
- Darko Pančev (1984–1991) 27/17
- Dragan Pantelić (1979–1984) 19/2
- Ilija Pantelić (1964–1968) 18/0
- Zlatko Papec (1953–1956) 6/4
- Ilijaš Pašić (1954–1959) 8/1
- Predrag Pašić (1981–1985) 10/1
- Daniel Paškvan (1921–1923) 4/0
- Blagoje Paunović (1967–1973) 39/0
- Ivan Pavelić (1927–1930) 5/1
- Đorđe Pavlić (1963–1964) 2/0
- Ivan Pavlica (1969–1969) 1/0
- Miroslav Pavlović (1968–1974) 46/2
- Alfons Pažur (1925–1925) 1/0
- Hugo Pažur (1923–1923) 2/0
- Adolf Percl (1926–1927) 3/2
- Nikola Perlić (1936–1939) 8/3
- Emil Perška (1920–1927) 14/2
- Željko Perušić (1959–1964) 27/0
- Luka Peruzović (1974–1983) 17/0
- Dušan Pešić (1980–1983) 4/0
- Aleksandar Petaković (1954–1959) 19/8
- Dušan Petković (1923–1926) 8/2
- Ilija Petković (1968–1974) 43/6
- Ivan Petrak (1934–1935) 6/1
- Gordan Petrić (1989–) 5/0
- Aleksandar Petrović (1938–1940) 9/5
- Božidar Petrović (1934–1934) 1/0
- Branko Petrović (1928–1930) 3/0
- Mihajlo Petrović (1980–1980) 1/0
- Miomir Petrović (1946–1949) 3/0
- Ognjen Petrović (1973–1976) 15/0
- Vladimir Petrović (1973–1982) 34/5
- Željko Petrović (1990–) 18/0
- Daniel Pirić (1969–1970) 6/1
- Josip Pirmajer (1964–1964) 4/0
- Eugen Placeriano (1924–1924) 1/0
- Branko Pleše (1937–1946) 6/3
- Jan Podhradski (1938–1938) 1/0
- Šime Poduje (1924–1927) 3/0
- Veljko Poduje (1924–1926) 3/0
- Antun Pogačnik (1937–1937) 2/0
- Danilo Popivoda (1972–1977) 20/5
- Stojan Popović (1927–1928) 5/0
- Vladimir Popović (1956–1965) 20/0
- Branimir Porobić (1920–1920) 1/0
- Zvonimir Požega (1939–1939) 3/0
- Boris Praunsberger (1930–1930) 1/1
- Danijel Premerl (1925–1932) 29/1
- Boro Primorac (1976–1980) 14/0
- Fahrudin Prljača (1966–1966) 1/0
- Boško Prodanović (1968–1968) 1/0
- Robert Prosinečki (1989–1991) 15/4
- Ivan Pudar (1985–1985) 1/0

== R ==
- Vladan Radača (1987–1988) 5/0
- Petar Radaković (1961–1964) 19/3
- Ljubomir Radanović (1983–1988) 34/3
- Petar Radenković (1956–1956) 3/0
- Vinko Radić (1924–1927) 3/0
- Predrag Radovanović (1931–1931) 1/0
- Lazar Radović (1963–1964) 7/0
- Miodrag Radović (1983–1984) 2/0
- Nikola Radović (1956–1956) 3/1
- Vasilije Radović (1964–1965) 3/0
- Zdravko Rajkov (1951–1958) 28/11
- Ante Rajković (1977–1978) 6/0
- Ljubiša Rajković (1970–1977) 14/0
- Marko Rajković (1931–1933) 2/0
- Milan Rajlić (1940–1940) 1/0
- Boško Ralić (1932–1933) 6/0
- Mladen Ramljak (1966–1972) 13/0
- Miodrag Ranojević (1930–1930) 1/0
- Branko Rašović (1964–1967) 10/0
- Mauro Ravnić (1986–1987) 6/0
- Srebrenko Repčić (1980–1980) 1/0
- Janko Rodin (1924–1926) 4/0
- Novak Roganović (1960–1960) 7/0
- Krasnodar Rora (1967–1968) 5/0
- Vedran Rožić (1978–1983) 10/0
- Antun Rudinski (1952–1952) 1/0
- Rudolf Rupec (1920–1924) 9/0
- Franjo Rupnik (1946–1950) 6/1
- Jovan Ružić (1920–1920) 2/1
- Milan Ružić (1983–1983) 2/0

== S ==
- Spasoje Samardžić (1962–1966) 26/3
- Božidar Sandić (1946–1946) 1/2
- Slobodan Santrač (1966–1974) 8/1
- Abraham Geza Saraz (1922–1923) 2/2
- Mladen Sarić (1938–1938) 1/0
- Toni Savevski (1988–1989) 2/0
- Dušan Savić (1975–1982) 12/4
- Dejan Savićević (1986–1999) 56/19
- Josip Scholz (1920–1923) 2/0
- Stevan Sekereš (1966–1966) 7/0
- Branislav Sekulić (1925–1936) 17/8
- Božidar Senčar (1949–1951) 3/1
- Dragan Simeunović (1980–1980) 1/0
- Nikola Simić (1920–1920) 1/0
- Miroslav Simonović (1980–1980) 1/0
- Kiril Simonovski (1946–1949) 10/1
- Zoran Simović (1983–1984) 10/0
- Josip Skoblar (1961–1967) 32/11
- Blaž Slišković (1978–1986) 26/3
- Branko Slivak (1932–1932) 1/0
- Admir Smajić (1987–1987) 5/0
- Drago Smajlović (1963–1964) 4/1
- Velimir Sombolac (1960–1960) 5/0
- Kuzman Sotirović (1928–1931) 5/2
- Ljubiša Spajić (1950–1957) 15/0
- Jovan Spasić (1931–1936) 15/0
- Predrag Spasić (1988–1991) 31/1
- Teofilo Spasojević (1928–1930) 2/0
- Metodije Spasovski (1968–1969) 3/3
- Edin Sprečo (1967–1969) 3/2
- Mario Stanić (1991–1991) 2/0
- Branko Stanković (1946–1956) 61/3
- Vujadin Stanojković (1988–1992) 21/1
- Nenad Starovlah (1979–1979) 2/0
- Ljubiša Stefanović (1930–1930) 4/0
- Dragoslav Stepanović (1970–1976) 34/1
- Goran Stevanović (1985–1985) 1/0
- Ivan Stevović (1933–1939) 5/1
- Branko Stinčić (1951–1951) 1/0
- Željko Stinčić (1978–1978) 1/0
- Nikola Stipić (1962–1962) 1/0
- Aleksandar Stojanović (1979–1979) 2/0
- Mirko Stojanović (1961–1964) 4/0
- Slavko Stojanović (1952–1958) 8/0
- Ranko Stojić (1984–1986) 14/0
- Đorđe Stojiljković (1940–1940) 3/0
- Dragan Stojković (1983–) 84/15
- Nenad Stojković (1977–1984) 32/1
- Vlada Stošić (1990–1990) 1/0
- Safet Sušić (1977–1990) 54/21
- Sead Sušić (1977–1977) 1/0
- Ratko Svilar (1976–1983) 9/0
- Slavko Svinjarević (1962–1962) 6/0

== Š ==
- Refik Šabanadžović (1986–1990) 8/0
- Nenad Šalov (1980–1980) 1/0
- Ivan Šantek (1956–1958) 6/0
- Dževad Šećerbegović (1977–1983) 9/0
- Bela Šefer (1924–1924) 1/0
- Dragoslav Šekularac (1956–1966) 41/6
- Miloš Šestić (1979–1985) 21/2
- Jaroslav Šifer (1920–1922) 6/1
- Geza Šifliš (1927–1928) 5/0
- Vasilije Šijaković (1957–1962) 11/0
- Vilim Šipoš (1934–1939) 13/1
- Zlatko Škorić (1964–1966) 8/0
- Haris Škoro (1985–1989) 15/4
- Slobodan Škrbić (1964–1964) 4/0
- Edhem Šljivo (1976–1982) 12/2
- Ivan Šojat (1922–1922) 3/0
- Milutin Šoškić (1959–1966) 50/0
- Franjo Šoštarić (1946–1951) 18/0
- Stjepan Šterk (1922–1922) 1/0
- Davor Šuker (1991–1991) 2/1
- Slavko Šurdonja (1933–1933) 1/0
- Ivica Šurjak (1973–1982) 54/10
- Suad Švraka (1955–1955) 1/0
- Zijad Švrakić (1984–1985) 4/1

== T ==
- Silvester Takač (1960–1966) 15/2
- Lazar Tasić (1952–1960) 13/1
- Stanko Tavčar (1920–1920) 2/0
- Anđelko Tešan (1968–1970) 11/0
- Aleksandar Tirnanić (1929–1940) 50/12
- Aleksandar Tomašević (1931–1938) 12/8
- Kosta Tomašević (1946–1951) 10/5
- Novak Tomić (1958–1963) 5/0
- Ivan Toplak (1956–1956) 1/0
- Dragan Tošić (1930–1933) 11/0
- Rade Tošić (1988–1988) 1/0
- Aleksandar Trifunović (1977–1983) 11/2
- Dobrivoje Trivić (1966–1969) 13/0
- Semir Tuce (1986–1989) 7/2

== U ==
- Josip Urbanke (1926–1926) 1/0

== V ==
- Drago Vabec (1973–1976) 7/1
- Svetislav Valjarević (1933–1941) 12/4
- Marko Valok (1949–1950) 6/3
- Miroslav Vardić (1968–1968) 2/0
- Velibor Vasović (1961–1966) 32/2
- Franjo Velfl (Franjo Wölfl) (1938–1951) 12/6
- Josip Velker (1938–1940) 3/1
- Vladimir Vermezović (1985–1985) 2/0
- Todor Veselinović (1953–1961) 37/28
- Risto Vidaković (1991–) 8/0
- Blagoje Vidinić (1956–1960) 8/0
- Joško Vidošević (1955–1955) 3/0
- Želimir Vidović (1977–1980) 2/0
- Vladimir Vinek (1922–1924) 6/3
- Dragoslav Virić (1931–1931) 2/0
- Franjo Vladić (1972–1977) 24/3
- Fadil Vokri (1984–1987) 12/6
- Dragutin Vragović (1920–1923) 7/0
- Stjepan Vrbančić (1922–1927) 12/0
- Dragutin Vrđuka (1920–1924) 7/0
- Budimir Vujačić (1989–) 12/0
- Đorđe Vujadinović (1929–1940) 44/18
- Đorđe Vujkov (1977–1977) 4/0
- Svetozar Vujović (1963–1964) 8/0
- Zlatko Vujović (1979–1990) 70/25
- Zoran Vujović (1979–1989) 34/2
- Bernard Vukas (1948–1957) 59/22
- Radomir Vukčević (1967–1971) 9/0
- Milan Vukelić (1957–1964) 3/0
- Nedeljko Vukoje (1966–1966) 1/0
- Branislav Vukosavljević (1949–1949) 2/0
- Momčilo Vukotić (1972–1978) 14/4
- Zoran Vulić (1986–1991) 25/1

== Z ==
- Slavko Zagorac (1932–1938) 7/0
- Velimir Zajec (1977–1985) 36/1
- Slaven Zambata (1962–1968) 31/21
- Ilija Zavišić (1976–1978) 9/0
- Branko Zebec (1951–1961) 65/17
- Dobrivoje Zečević (1931–1938) 18/4
- Miljan Zeković (1952–1955) 13/0
- Josip Zemko (1965–1965) 3/0
- Branko Zinaja (1921–1923) 6/4
- Dušan Zinaja (1923–1923) 1/0

== Ž ==
- Ante Žanetić (1959–1960) 15/2
- Todor Živanović (1950–1950) 5/3
- Aleksandar Živković (1931–1935) 15/15
- Jovan Živković (1930–1930) 1/0
- Zvonko Živković (1982–1985) 5/2
- Slaviša Žungul (1974–1978) 14/0
- Vjekoslav Župančić (1920–1920) 1/0

== See also ==
- Football in Yugoslavia
- Yugoslavia national football team
- Yugoslavia national football team games
- List of Yugoslavia national football team goalscorers
- List of Bosnia and Herzegovina international footballers
- List of Croatia international footballers
- List of Kosovo international footballers
- List of Kosovo international footballers (1–9 caps)
- List of Montenegro international footballers
- List of North Macedonia international footballers
- List of Serbia international footballers (including predecessor teams)
- List of Slovenia international footballers

== External sources ==
- Reprezentacija.rs.
