= List of Serbia international footballers (including predecessor teams) =

This is a list of all football players that have played for the Serbia national football team, including predecessor teams of the Kingdom of Serbs, Croats and Slovenes, Yugoslavia, FR Yugoslavia and Serbia and Montenegro.

Ordered alphabetically by the surname followed by the years of their appearances and number of matches and goals.

Updated 25 May 2012

== A ==
- Jovan Aćimović (1968/1976) 55/3
- Đuka Agić (1930/1930) 1/0
- Danijel Aleksić (2008/2008) 1/0
- Rajko Aleksić (1968/1968) 2/0
- Dušan Anđelković (2007/2007) 1/0
- Jovan Anđelković (1965/1966) 2/0
- Slobodan Anđelković (1937/1937) 1/0
- Andrija Anković (1960/1962) 8/1
- Boško Antić (1968/1968) 1/0
- Radomir Antić (1973/1973) 1/0
- Sava Antić (1956/1956) 5/2
- Milan Antolković (1937/1939) 8/1
- Zoran Antonijević (1970/1972) 8/0
- Milorad Arsenijević (1927/1936) 52/0
- Zijad Arslanagić (1965/1965) 1/0
- Mustafa Arslanović (1987/1987) 1/0
- Aljoša Asanović (1987/1988) 3/0
- Aleksandar Atanacković (1946/1950) 15/1
- Vlada Avramov (2007/2007) 2/0
- Radojko Avramović (1978/1978) 1/0

== B ==
- Dragutin Babić (1921/1931) 10/2
- Nikola Babić (1928/1932) 3/0
- Stefan Babović (2007/2008) 4/0
- Boban Babunski (1991/1991) 2/0
- Edin Bahtić (1984/1985) 2/0
- Dušan Bajević (1970/1977) 37/29
- Mane Bajić (1966/1969) 2/0
- Milenko Bajić (1970/1970) 1/0
- Božo Bakota (1978/1978) 1/0
- Mirsad Baljić (1984/1990) 29/3
- Zoran Banović (2004/2004) 1/0
- Ivica Barbarić (1988/1988) 1/0
- Marko Baša (2005/2005) 3/0
- Dušan Basta (2005/2012) 4/0
- Slobodan Batričević (1983/1983) 1/0
- Zoran Batrović (1984/1984) 1/0
- Mehmed Baždarević (1983/1992) 54/4
- Vladimir Beara (1950/1959) 59/0
- Radoslav Bečejac (1965/1970) 12 0
- Zvonko Bego (1961/1961) 6/2
- Ivica Bek (1927/1931) 7/4
- Jovan Beleslin (1939/1939) 1/0
- Miloš Beleslin (1928/1930) 8/1
- Bruno Belin (1952/1959) 25/0
- Rudolf Belin (1963/1969) 29/6
- Nikola Beljić (2010/2010) 1/1
- Ivan Belošević (1933/1939) 11/0
- Nikola Beljić (2010/2010) 1/0
- Stevan Bena (1959/1961) 7/0
- Ljubo Benčić (1924/1927) 5/2
- Aleksandar Benko (1949/1949) 1/0
- Ivan Benković (1923/1923) 1/0
- Dragiša Binić (1990/1991) 3/1
- Ibrahim Biogradlić (1956/1956) 1/0
- Milan Biševac (2006/2011) 9/0
- August Bivec (1933/1933) 1/0
- Nikoslav Bjegović (1998/1998) 1/0
- Nenad Bjeković (1968/1976) 22/4
- Filip Blašković (1969/1969) 1/0
- Zvonimir Boban (1988/1991) 7/1
- Stjepan Bobek (1946/1956) 63/38
- Dragan Bogavac (2002/2002) 1/0
- Srećko Bogdan (1977/1983) 11/0
- Igor Bogdanović (2001/2001) 2/0
- Rade Bogdanović (1997/1997) 3/2
- Vladislav Bogićević (1971/1977) 23/2
- Miloš Bogunović (2008/2008) 1/0
- Zoran Bojović (1983/1983) 2/0
- Dražen Bolić (1995/2000) 7/0
- Mario Boljat (1977/1978) 5/0
- Antun Bonačić (1924/1931) 8/2
- Mirko Bonačić (1924/1928) 6/3
- Petar Borota (1977/1978) 4/0
- Vujadin Boškov (1951/1958) 57/0
- Branko Bošković (2002/2005) 12/1
- Miroslav Bošković (1968/1972) 6/0
- Branko Bošnjak (1983/1983) 1/0
- Radivoj Božić (1934/1934) 1/0
- Boban Božović (1983/1983) 1/0
- Vojin Božović (1936/1941) 8/5
- Darko Brašanac (2015) 3/0
- Blagoje Bratić (1972/1972) 3/0
- Dragutin Bratulić (1934/1935) 3/0
- Mirko Braun (1963/1963) 3/0
- Željko Brkić (2010/2011) 5/0
- Marijan Brncić (1962/1967) 10/0
- Bojan Brnović (2002/2002) 2/1
- Branko Brnović (1989/1998) 27/3
- Dragoljub Brnović (1987/1990) 25/1
- Nenad Brnović (2002/2005) 15/0
- Božo Broketa (1947/1948) 3/0
- Miroslav Brozović (1940/1948) 17/0
- Ivica Brzić (1966/1966) 1/0
- Josip Bukal (1966/1974) 24/10
- Ivan Buljan (1973/1981) 36/2
- Goran Bunjevčević (1998/2003) 16/0
- Miloš Bursać (1985/1985) 2/0

== C ==
- Željko Cicović (2000/2000) 6/0
- Zvonimir Cimermančić (1940/1948) 9/3
- Slavin Cindrić (1920/1928) 5/3
- Jovan Cokić (1952/1955) 2/1
- Tomislav Crnković (1952/1960) 51/0
- Nikica Cukrov (1977/1983) 14/0
- Rudolf Cvek (1968/1969) 6/0
- Borislav Cvetković (1983/1988) 11/1
- Zvjezdan Cvetković (1982/1987) 9/1

== Č ==
- Ratomir Čabrić (1938/1938) 1/0
- Željko Čajkovski (1947/1951) 19/12
- Zlatko Čajkovski (1946/1955) 55/7
- Damir Čakar (1995/2001) 3/0
- Vlado Čapljić (1984/1985) 4/0
- Srđan Čebinac (1964/1964) 1/0
- Zvezdan Čebinac (1959/1964) 20/4
- Marijan Čerček (1969/1969) 1/0
- Ratko Čolić (1949/1951) 14/0
- Vladimir Čonč (1956/1956) 1/0
- Josip Čop (1984/1984) 2/0
- Milan Čop (1963/1964) 10/0
- Bartol Čulić (1931/1935) 10/0

== Ć ==
- Dragan Ćirić (1995/1997) 4/0
- Milivoje Ćirković (2000/2005) 9/0
- Saša Ćurčić (1991/1998) 14/1
- Edin Ćurić (1987/1987) 1/0
- Ivan Ćurković (1963/1970) 19/0

== D ==
- Jovan Damjanović (2011/2011) 3/0
- Milan Damjanović (1967/1968) 7/0
- Eugen Dasović (1923/1927) 10/0
- Fahrija Dautbegović (1969/1970) 2/0
- Aleksandar Davidov (2010/2010) 1/0
- Sreten Davidović (1953/1953) 1/0
- Sergije Demić (1932/1933) 4/0
- Damir Desnica (1978/1978) 1/1
- Miroslav Dešković (1931/1931) 1/0
- Ranko Despotović (2007/2008) 4/0
- Stjepan Deverić (1982/1984) 6/0
- Branislav Dimitrijević (1928/1933) 5/0
- Vladimir Dišljenković (2004/2009) 7/0
- Petar Divić (2001/2001) 2/0
- Boban Dmitrović (2001/2003) 13/0
- Rudolf Dobrijević (1930/1930) 1/0
- Kiril Dojčinovski (1968/1970) 6/0
- Zlatko Dračić (1965/1965) 1/0
- Milorad Dragičević (1926/1928) 2/0
- Prvoslav Dragičević (1939/1940) 6/0
- Ivica Dragutinović (2000/2010) 49/0
- Božidar Drenovac (1947/1947) 1/0
- Anto Drobnjak (1996/1998) 7/4
- Branislav Drobnjak (1983/1983) 1/0
- Goran Drulić (2000/2001) 4/0
- Ljubinko Drulović (1996/2001) 38/3
- Ernest Dubac (1938/1941) 14/0
- Slobodan Dubajić (1994/1994) 1/0
- Artur Dubravčić (1920/1924) 9/1
- Ivan Dudić (2000/2001) 7/0
- Milan Dudić (2001/2006) 13/0
- Ratomir Dujković (1971/1971) 4/0
- Petar Dujmović (1924/1924) 1/0
- Igor Duljaj (2000/2007) 47/0
- Ljubiša Dunđerski (1997/1997) 1/0
- Vladimir Durković (1959/1966) 50/0
- Dionizije Dvornić (1953/1954) 6/1

== Dž ==
- Dragan Džajić (1964/1979) 85/23
- Jasmin Džeko (1983/1983) 2/1
- Nenad Džodić (2002/2002) 5/0
- Vilson Džoni (1974/1978) 4/0

== Đ ==
- Predrag Đajić (1949/1953) 17/0
- Svetozar Đanić (1940/1941) 3/0
- Miloš Đelmas (1987/1987) 1/0
- Petar Đenić (2000/2000) 1/0
- Momčilo Đokić (1930/1936) 13/0
- Boriša Đorđević (1976/1977) 5/0
- Borivoje Đorđević (1967/1971) 9/0
- Filip Đorđević (2012/2014) 14/4
- Kristijan Đorđević (1998/1998) 1/0
- Ljubiša Đorđević (1928/1931) 5/0
- Nenad Đorđević (2002/2006) 17/1
- Predrag Đorđević (1998/2006) 37/1
- Milovan Đorić (1969/1969) 1/0
- Goran Đorović (1994/2001) 49/0
- Miroslav Đukić (1991/2001) 48/2
- Vladislav Đukić (1988/1988) 2/1
- Anđelko Đuričić (2010/2010) 4/0
- Filip Đuričić (2012/2012) 2/0
- Igor Đurić (2008/2009) 4/0
- Vladeta Đurić (1926/1926) 1/0
- Boško Đurovski (1982/1989) 4/0
- Milko Đurovski (1984/1985) 6/2

== E ==
- Marko Elsner (1984/1988) 14/0
- Ivan Ergić (2006/2008) 11/0

== F ==
- Mirsad Fazlagić (1963/1968) 19/0
- Ljubomir Fejsa (2007/2012) 6/0
- Antuna Kolnago Ferante (1929/1929) 1/0
- Fric Ferderber (1922/1922) 1/0
- Asim Ferhatović (1961/1961) 1/0
- Nijaz Ferhatović (1982/1982) 2/0
- Zoran Filipović (1971/1977) 13/2
- Vladimir Firm (1947/1949) 3/0
- Dragutin Fridrih (1922/1927) 9/0

== G ==
- Ivan Gajer (1932/1937) 28/0
- Milan Galić (1959/1965) 51/37
- Goran Gavrančić (2002/2006) 28/0
- Petar Georgijevski (1984/1984) 1/0
- Franjo Giler (1926/1932) 13/3
- Franjo Glaser (1933/1940) 35/0
- Svetislav Glišović (1932/1940) 21/9
- Jovan Gojković (1998/1998) 1/0
- Ivan Golac (1976/1976) 1/0
- Vinko Golob (1948/1948) 1/0
- Dejan Govedarica (1994/2000) 29/2
- Nenad Gračan (1984/1986) 10/2
- Branko Gračanin (1968/1970) 10/1
- Ivan Granec (1920/1920) 1/0
- Mirko Grdenić (1925/1925) 1/0
- Nenad Grozdić (1998/2000) 11/0
- Spira Grujić (2000/2000) 1/0
- Ivan Gudelj (1980/1986) 33/3
- Dragan Gugleta (1965/1966) 8/2
- Ivan Gvozdenović (2001/2001) 1/0

== H ==
- Džemal Hadžiabdić (1974/1978) 20/0
- Enver Hadžiabdić (1970/1974) 11/0
- Faruk Hadžibegić (1982/1992) 61/6
- Ismet Hadžić (1979/1983) 5/0
- Vahid Halilhodžić (1976/1985) 15/8
- Sulejman Halilović (1983/1984) 12/1
- Mustafa Hasanagić (1965/1967) 5/0
- Jusuf Hatunić (1972/1978) 8/0
- Antun Herceg (1950/1957) 12/2
- Bernard Higl (1934/1939) 24/0
- Ivan Hitrec (1929/1939) 14/10
- Rudolf Hitrec (1926/1926) 1/0
- Ivan Hlevnjak (1969/1970) 3/0
- Edvard Hočevar (1950/1950) 1/1
- Dragan Holcer (1965/1974) 52/0
- Ivica Horvat (1946/1956) 60/0
- Janoš Horvat (1929/1929) 1/0
- Vladimir-Drago Horvat (1949/1949) 1/0
- Idriz Hošić (1968/1968) 2/0
- Branislav Hrnjiček (1929/1930) 5/1
- Miloš Hrstić (1978/1982) 10/0
- Mustafa Hukić (1977/1977) 5/0

== I ==
- Aleksandar Ignjovski (2012/2012) 3/0
- Brana Ilić (2011/2011) 1/0
- Radiša Ilić (2008/2008) 1/0
- Saša Ilić (1998/2001) 2/0
- Saša Ilić (2000/2008) 37/4
- Ivica Iliev (2003/2003) 2/1
- Dimitrije Injac (2011/2011) 1/0
- Bojan Isailović (2008/2009) 4/0
- Branislav Ivanović (2005/2012) 50/6
- Zvonko Ivezić (1975/1976) 4/2
- Ilija Ivić (1998/1998) 1/0
- Vladimir Ivić (2001/2004) 8/0
- Milutin Ivković (1925/1934) 39/0
- Tomislav Ivković (1983/1991) 38/0
- Aleksandar Ivoš (1962/1962) 3/0

== J ==
- Lajoš Jakovetić (1949/1949) 4/0
- Dragan Jakovljević (1987/1989) 8/3
- Milovan Jakšić (1930/1934) 9/0
- Čedomir Janevski (1987/1987) 2/0
- Rajko Janjanin (1979/1980) 2/0
- Boško Janković (2006/2012) 30/5
- Božo Janković (1972/1972) 2/0
- Milan Janković (1986/1989) 12/1
- Milorad Janković (1966/1966) 1/0
- Slobodan Janković (1975/1975) 1/0
- Marijan Jantoljak (1966/1966) 2/0
- Robert Jarni (1990/1991) 7/1
- Ešref Jašarević (1977/1977) 2/0
- Zvonko Jazbec (1934/1938) 10/0
- Ivan Jazbinšek (1938/1941) 7/0
- Živorad Jeftić (1964/1969) 16/0
- Zoran Jelikić (1976/1983) 8/0
- Dražan Jerković (1960/1964) 21/11
- Jure Jerković (1970/1981) 43/6
- Ive Jerolimov (1980/1982) 6/0
- Miodrag Ješić (1982/1984) 8/2
- Nenad Jestrović (2003/2005) 12/5
- Dragoslav Jevrić (2002/2006) 43/0
- Aleksandar Jevtić (2008/2008) 1/0
- Jovan Jezerkić (1947/1947) 4/5
- Stanoje Jocić (1952/1954) 4/2
- Slaviša Jokanović (1991/2002) 64/10
- Đorđe Jokić (2004/2005) 4/0
- Bojan Jorgačević (2010/2011) 7/0
- Milan Jovanić (2010/2010) 1/0
- Branislav Jovanović (2011/2011) 1/0
- Dragan Jovanović (1923/1928) 8/4
- Mija Jovanović (1930/1931) 3/0
- Milan Jovanović (2007/2012) 44/11
- Miodrag Jovanović (1947/1950) 25/0
- Nikola Jovanović (1979/1982) 7/0
- Aleksandar Jović (1998/1998) 1/0
- Zoran Jovičić (1996/1997) 2/1
- Milan Jovin (1980/1982) 4/0
- Davor Jozić (1984/1991) 27/2
- Vladimir Jugović (1991/2002) 41/3
- Željko Jurčić (1976/1976) 1/0
- Ante Jurić (1959/1959) 1/0
- Goran Jurić (1988/1989) 4/0
- Predrag Jurić (1986/1987) 2/0
- Fahrudin Jusufi (1959/1967) 55/0

== K ==
- Ratko Kacijan (1946/1946) 1/0
- Gojko Kačar (2007/2012) 25/0
- Damir Kahriman (2008/2012) 5/0
- Sead Kajtaz (1986/1986) 1/0
- Tomislav Kaloperović (1957/1961) 6/1
- Andrija Kaluđerović (2010/2011) 3/0
- Dragan Kanatlarovski (1990/1990) 1/0
- Mirza Kapetanović (1983/1985) 6/0
- Stanislav Karasi (1973/1974) 10/4
- Vlado Kasalo (1987/1987) 1/0
- Ivan Katalinić (1977/1978) 13/0
- Josip Katalinski (1972/1977) 41/10
- Srečko Katanec (1983/1990) 31/5
- Ilija Katić (1968/1969) 4/0
- Mihalj Kečkeš (1937/1938) 2/0
- Ante Kesić (1924/1924) 1/0
- Mateja Kežman (2000/2006) 49/17
- Hugo Kinert (1921/1922) 2/0
- Vladimir Klaić (1953/1953) 1/0
- Nikica Klinčarski (1980/1983) 8/1
- Tomislav Knez (1960/1961) 14/8
- Bruno Knežević (1938/1938) 1/0
- Miodrag Knežević (1966/1967) 2/0
- Zdenko Kobeščak (1963/1964) 2/0
- Aleksandar Kocić (1994/2001) 22/0
- Slavko Kodrnja (1933/1933) 4/4
- Meho Kodro (1991/1992) 2/0
- Andreja Kojić (1920/1920) 1/0
- Ljubomir Kokeza (1946/1952) 2/0
- Mirko Kokotović (1931/1939) 23/4
- Božidar Kolaković (1951/1951) 1/0
- Miloš Kolaković (2004/2004) 3/0
- Aleksandar Kolarov (2008/2012) 30/0
- Slobodan Komljenović (1994/2000) 22/3
- Ognjen Koroman (2002/2007) 36/1
- Mladen Koščak (1956/1956) 4/0
- Borivoje Kostić (1956/1964) 33/26
- Abid Kovačević (1977/1977) 2/0
- Darko Kovačević (1994/2004) 59/10
- Nenad Kovačević (2003/2008) 25/0
- Oliver Kovačević (2005/2005) 3/0
- Saša Kovačević (1998/1998) 1/0
- Vladimir Kovačević (1960/1965) 13/2
- Frane Kovačić (1932/1933) 5/0
- Aleksandar Kozlina (1960/1961) 9/0
- Vladimir Kragić (1930/1934) 6/4
- Branko Kralj (1954/1955) 3/0
- Ivica Kralj (1996/2001) 41/0
- Zlatko Kranjčar (1977/1983) 11/3
- Miloš Krasić (2006/2011) 46/4
- Aleksandar Kristić (1998/1998) 1/0
- Miodrag Krivokapić (1987/1988) 5/0
- Radovan Krivokapić (2001/2002) 4/0
- Petar Krivokuća (1972/1974) 13/0
- Srboljub Krivokuća (1956/1961) 7/0
- Mirko Križ (1925/1929) 2/0
- Zlatko Krmpotić (1980/1982) 8/0
- Jozo Krnić (1947/1947) 1/1
- Mladen Krstajić (1999/2008) 59/2
- Dobrosav Krstić (1955/1960) 30/1
- Mišo Krstićević (1979/1980) 7/1
- Vinko Kuci (Vinko Cuzzi) (1965/1966) 8/0
- Andrija Kujundžić (1921/1922) 2/0
- Branko Kunst (1926/1930) 7/0
- Mirko Kurir (1924/1924) 2/0
- Miodrag Kustudić (1977/1978) 3/0
- Ivan Kurtušić (2000/2005) 19/2
- Zdravko Kuzmanović (2007/2012) 45/6

== L ==
- Dražen Ladić (1991/1991) 2/0
- Vladimir Lajnert (1926/1929) 5/2
- Nenad Lalatović (2000/2000) 1/0
- Stjepan Lamza (1963/1967) 7/0
- Vojin Lazarević (1964/1969) 5/1
- Nikola Lazetić (1998/2003) 2//1
- Danko Lazović (2002/2010) 43/11
- Darko Lazović (2008/2008) 1/0
- Gustav Lehner (1931/1940) 44/0
- Dejan Lekić (2009/2012) 4/0
- Dragoje Leković (1988/1998) 14/0
- Leo Lemešić (1929/1932) 5/3
- Lazar Lemić (1964/1964) 2/0
- August Lešnik (1937/1940) 10/4
- Pavao Lev (Pavao Löw) (1933/1933) 3/0
- Luka Lipošinović (1954/1960) 13/3
- Đorđe Lojančić (1936/1937) 2/0
- Dragutin Lojen (1946/1946) 3/0
- Marko Lomić (2010/2010) 2/0
- Petar Lončarević (1930/1930) 2/0
- Ljubomir Lovrić (1939/1948) 5/0
- Stevan Luburić (1925/1930) 6/1
- Žarko Lučić (2000/2000) 1/0
- Vladimir Lukarić (1961/1965) 6/1
- Miroslav Lukić (1930/1934) 8/0
- Vladan Lukić (1991/1998) 6/2
- Aleksandar Luković (2005/2010) 27/0
- Slavko Luštica (1951/1952) 3/0

== Lj ==
- Adem Ljajić (2010/2012) 7/0
- Milan Ljubenović (1954/1955) 4/0
- Danijel Ljuboja (2003/2006) 19/1
- Živan Ljukovčan (1985/1986) 4/0

== M ==
- Nikola Malbaša (2003/2003) 5/0
- Rodoljub Malenčić (1922/1922) 1/0
- Dragan Mance (1983/1983) 4/0
- Radivoje Manić (1997/1997) 1/0
- Petar Manola (1939/1941) 9/0
- Lav Mantula (1954/1954) 1/0
- Dušan Maravić (1960/1960) 7/3
- Remija Marcikić (1921/1921) 1/0
- Enver Marić (1972/1976) 32/0
- Miloš Marić (2004/2005) 7/0
- Zoran Marić (1983/1983) 2/0
- Sava Marinković (1928/1930) 3/0
- Vinko Marinović (1998/1998) 1/0
- Blagoje Marjanović (1926/1938) 57/36
- Mare Marjanović (1924/1926) 6/0
- Nikola Marjanović (1933/1933) 1/0
- Jovan Markoski (2003/2004) 4/0
- Dušan Marković (1932/1932) 1/0
- Lazar Marković (2012/2012) 1/0
- Marjan Marković (2002/2008) 16/0
- Predrag Marković (1954/1954) 1/1
- Slobodan Marković (2003/2003) 3/0
- Vladimir Marković (1961/1962) 16/0
- Slobodan Marović (1987/1989) 4/0
- Egidio Martinović (1927/1927) 1/0
- Vladimir Martinović (1997/1997) 3/0
- Anđelko Marušić (1930/1935) 16/0
- Nenad Maslovar (1997/1997) 3/0
- Florijan Matekalo (1940/1940) 1/0
- Nemanja Matić (2008/2012) 3/0
- Vladimir Matijević (1980/1984) 3/0
- Frane Matošić (1938/1953) 16/6
- Jozo Matošić (1934/1940) 24/0
- Željko Matuš (1960/1962) 13/5
- Ivan Medarić (1937/1939) 3/0
- Vojislav Melić (1962/1967) 27/2
- Rizah Mešković (1972/1972) 1/0
- Branislav Mihajlović (1959/1960) 8/4
- Dragoslav Mihajlović (1930/1930) 4/0
- Ljubomir Mihajlović (1966/1968) 6/0
- Prvoslav Mihajlović (1946/1950) 13/6
- Radmilo Mihajlović (1986/1989) 6/1
- Siniša Mihajlović (1991/2003) 63/9
- Maksimilijan Mihalčić (1925/1931) 18/0
- Predrag Mijatović (1989/2003) 73/28
- Marko Mikačić (1930/1931) 3/0
- Jovan Miladinović (1959/1964) 17/0
- Darko Milanič (1991/1992) 5/0
- Zoran Milenković (1966/1966) 1/0
- Nenad Milijaš (2008/2011) 25/4
- Marko Milinković (2009/2009) 1/0
- Anđelo Milevoj (1966/1966) 4/0
- Đorđe Milić (1964/1964) 1/0
- Goran Miljanović (1983/1988) 4/1
- Ivica Miljković (1975/1975) 1/0
- Branko Miljuš (1984/1988) 14/0
- Goran Milojević (1988/1989) 2/0
- Zvonko Milojević (1995/1997) 10/0
- Cvijan Milošević (1988/1988) 1/0
- Savo Milošević (1994/2008) 102/37
- Slavko Milošević (1930/1934) 4/0
- Sima Milovanov (1951/1954) 4/0
- Dejan Milovanović (2008/2008) 2/0
- Milovan Milović (2010/2010) 1/0
- Šime Milutin (1939/1939) 1/0
- Miloš Milutinović (1953/1958) 33/16
- Marko Mirić (2010/2011) 3/0
- Miško Mirković (1997/1997) 2/0
- Zoran Mirković (1995/2003) 59/0
- Ante Miročević (1978/1980) 6/2
- Rajko Mitić (1946/1957) 59/32
- Milorad Mitrović (1928/1935) 3/0
- Nikola Mitrović (2010/2010) 1/0
- Dragan Mladenović (2003/2005) 17/1
- Nenad Mladenović (2002/2002) 1/0
- Marko Mlinarić (1983/1988) 17/1
- Sokrat Mojsov (1964/1966) 3/0
- Zvonko Monsider (1946/1947) 7/0
- Dragan Mrđa (2008/2011) 12/2
- Mitar Mrkela (1982/1986) 5/1
- Srđan Mrkušić (1941/1950) 11/0
- Muhamed Mujić (1956/1962) 32/17
- Fikret Mujkić (1968/1970) 5/1
- Husref Musemić (1983/1983) 1/0
- Vahidin Musemić (1968/1970) 17/9
- Džemaludin Mušović (1965/1968) 10/2
- Džemal Mustedanagić (1980/1980) 1/0
- Miljan Mutavdžić (2008/2009) 2/0
- Dragan Mutibarić (1969/1970) 10/0
- Dražen Mužinić (1974/1979) 32/1

== N ==
- Mihajlo Načević (1926/1926) 1/0
- Albert Nađ (1994/2006) 45/3
- Petar Nadoveza (1967/1967) 1/0
- Dragutin Najdanović (1928/1930) 4/1
- Ilija Najdoski (1990/1992) 11/1
- Matija Nastasić (2012/2012) 1/0
- Velimir Naumović (1963/1964) 3/0
- Stevan Neštički (1967/1967) 1/0
- Bojan Neziri (2004/2005) 3/0
- Petar Nikezić (1971/1973) 3/0
- Dušan Nikolić (1976/1977) 4/1
- Jovica Nikolić (1985/1985) 1/0
- Milorad Nikolić (1940/1941) 3/0
- Slavoljub Nikolić (1982/1982) 2/0
- Žarko Nikolić (1959/1961) 9/0
- Pavle Ninkov (2008/2012) 8/0
- Miloš Ninković (2009/2012) 26/0
- Džoni Novak (1991/1992) 4/0
- Marjan Novak (1967/1967) 1/0
- Martin Novoselac (1975/1976) 4/0

== Nj ==
- Zoran Njeguš (1996/2003) 7/0

== O ==
- Brane Oblak (1970/1977) 46/6
- Ivan Obradović (2008/2012) 19/1
- Milan Obradović (2000/2001) 7/0
- Milovan Obradović (1977/1977) 1/0
- Predrag Ocokoljić (2003/2004) 2/0
- Tihomir Ognjanov (1950/1956) 28/7
- Dejan Ognjanović (2001/2001) 2/0
- Ljubomir Ognjanović (1958/1958) 1/0
- Radivoj Ognjanović (1957/1959) 5/1
- Perica Ognjenović (1995/1998) 8/0
- Fahrudin Omerović (1989/1992) 8/0
- Ivica Osim (1964/1969) 16/8
- Stevan Ostojić (1964/1971) 2/0
- Ivan Ožegović (1947/1947) 2/0

== P ==
- Božidar Pajević (1954/1954) 1 0
- Miloš Pajević (1949/1949) 3 3
- Bela Palfi (1948/1951) 3 0
- Andrej Panadić (1989/1989) 3 0
- Darko Pančev (1984/1991) 27 17
- Goran Pandurović 1994/1995 4 0
- Dragan Pantelić 1979/1984 19 2
- Ilija Pantelić 1964/1968 18 0
- Marko Pantelić 2003/2011 43/10
- Miodrag Pantelić 1995/1995 5 0
- Aleksandar Pantić 2004/2004 2 0
- Milinko Pantić 1996/1996 2 0
- Zlatko Papec 1953/1956 6 4
- Ilijaš Pašić 1954/1959 8 1
- Predrag Pašić 1981/1985 10 1
- Daniel Paškvan 1921/1923 4 0
- Blagoje Paunović 1967/1973 39 0
- Veljko Paunović 2002/2004 2 1
- Ivan Pavelić 1927/1930 5 1
- Đorđe Pavlić 1963/1964 2 0
- Ivan Pavlica 1969/1969 1 0
- Miroslav Pavlović 1968/1974 46 2
- Alfons Pažur 1925/1925 1 0
- Hugo Pažur 1923/1923 2 0
- Nemanja Pejčinović 2008/2008 1 0
- Adolf Percl 1926/1927 3 2
- Nikola Perlić 1936/1939 8 3
- Marko Perović 1995/1996 3 0
- Emil Perška 1920/1927 14 2
- Željko Perušić 1959/1964 27 0
- Luka Peruzović 1974/1983 17 0
- Dušan Pešić 1980/1983 4 0
- Aleksandar Petaković 1954/1959 19 8
- Dejan Petković 1995/1998 6 1
- Dušan Petković 2000/2004 7 0
- Dušan Petković 1923/1926 8 2
- Ilija Petković 1968/1974 43 6
- Ivan Petrak 1934/1935 6 1
- Gordan Petrić 1989/1997 5 0
- Dušan Petronijević (2011/2011) 1/0
- Aleksandar Petrović 1938/1940 9 5
- Božidar Petrović 1934/1934 1 0
- Branko Petrović 1928/1930 3 0
- Mihajlo Petrović 1980/1980 1 0
- Miomir Petrović 1946/1949 3 0
- Ognjen Petrović 1973/1976 15 0
- Radosav Petrović 2009/2012 26/1
- Saša Petrović 1998/1998 1 0
- Vladimir Petrović 1973/1982 34 5
- Željko Petrović 1990/1998 18 0
- Daniel Pirić 1969/1970 6 1
- Josip Pirmajer 1964/1964 4 0
- Mihajlo Pjanović 2000/2002 5 0
- Eugen Placeriano 1924/1924 1 0
- Branko Pleše 1937/1946 6 3
- Jan Podhradski 1938/1938 1 0
- Šime Poduje 1924/1927 3 0
- Veljko Poduje 1924/1926 3 0
- Antun Pogačnik 1937/1937 2 0
- Vukašin Poleksić 2002/2002 1 0
- Danilo Popivoda 1972/1977 20 5
- Stojan Popović 1927/1928 5 0
- Vladimir Popović 1956/1965 20 0
- Branimir Porobić 1920/1920 1 0
- Zvonimir Požega 1939/1939 3 0
- Boris Praunsberger 1930/1930 1 1
- Danijel Premerl 1925/1932 29 1
- Boro Primorac 1976/1980 14 0
- Fahrudin Prljača 1966/1966 1 0
- Boško Prodanović 1968/1968 1 0
- Robert Prosinečki 1989/1991 15 4
- Ivan Pudar 1985/1985 1 0

== R ==
- Vladan Radača (1987/1988) 5/0
- Petar Radaković (1961/1964) 19/3
- Radovan Radaković (2001/2001) 2/0
- Ljubomir Radanović (1983/1988) 34/3
- Petar Radenković (1956/1956) 3/0
- Vinko Radić (1924/1927) 3/0
- Dejan Rađenović (2001/2001) 2/0
- Ivan Radovanović (2010/2012) 2/0
- Predrag Radovanović (1931/1931) 1/0
- Lazar Radović (1963/1964) 7/0
- Miodrag Radović (1983/1984) 2/0
- Nikola Radović (1956/1956) 3/1
- Vasilije Radović (1964/1965) 3/0
- Zdravko Rajkov (1951/1958) 28/11
- Ante Rajković (1977/1978) 6/0
- Ljubiša Rajković (1970/1977) 14/0
- Marko Rajković (1931/1933) 2/0
- Slobodan Rajković (2008/2012) 12/0
- Milan Rajlić (1940/1940) 1/0
- Boško Ralić (1932/1933) 6/0
- Mladen Ramljak (1966/1972) 13/0
- Zoran Ranković (1998/1998) 1/0
- Miodrag Ranojević (1930/1930) 1/0
- Branko Rašović (1964/1967) 10/0
- Vuk Rašović (1997/2001) 5/0
- Mauro Ravnić (1986/1987) 6/0
- Srebrenko Repčić (1980/1980) 1/0
- Predrag Ristović (2001/2001) 1/0
- Nemanja Rnić (2005/2008) 3/0
- Janko Rodin (1924/1926) 4/0
- Novak Roganović (1960/1960) 7/0
- Krasnodar Rora (1967/1968) 5/0
- Vedran Rožić (1978/1983) 10/0
- Antun Rudinski (1952/1952) 1/0
- Antonio Rukavina (2007/2010) 22/0
- Rudolf Rupec (1920/1924) 9/0
- Franjo Rupnik (1946/1950) 6/1
- Jovan Ružić (1920/1920) 2/1
- Milan Ružić (1983/1983) 2/0

== S ==
- Nenad Sakić Nenad 1998/2000 6 0
- Radoslav Samardžić Radoslav 1995/1995 1 0
- Spasoje Samardžić Spasoje 1962/1966 26 3
- Božidar Sandić 1946/1946 1 2
- Slobodan Santrač 1966/1974 8 1
- Abraham Geza Saraz 1922/1923 2 2
- Mladen Sarić Mladen 1938/1938 1 0
- Niša Saveljić 1995/2000 32 1
- Toni Savevski Toni 1988/1989 2 0
- Dušan Savić 1975/1982 12 4
- Miroslav Savić Miroslav 1998/1998 2 0
- Dejan Savićević Dejan 1986/1999 56 19
- Josip Scholz Josip 1920/1923 2 0
- Stevan Sekereš Stevan 1966/1966 7 0
- Branislav Sekulić Branislav 1925/1936 17 8
- Božidar Senčar 1949/1951 3 1
- Dragan Simeunović Dragan 1980/1980 1 0
- Nikola Simić Nikola 1920/1920 1 0
- Miroslav Simonović Miroslav 1980/1980 1 0
- Saša Simonović 2000/2000 1 0
- Kiril Simonovski Kiril 1946/1949 10 1
- Zoran Simović Zoran 1983/1984 10 0
- Josip Skoblar Josip 1961/1967 32 11 `
- Blaž Slišković 1978/1986 26 3
- Branko Slivak Branko 1932/1932 1 0
- Admir Smajić Admir 1987/1987 5 0
- Drago Smajlović 1963/1964 4 1
- Milan Smiljanić Milan 2007/2008 6 1
- Velimir Sombolac Velimir 1960/1960 5 0
- Kuzman Sotirović Kuzman 1928/1931 5 2
- Ljubiša Spajić 1950/1957 15 0
- Jovan Spasić Jovan 1931/1936 15 0
- Predrag Spasić Predrag 1988/1991 31 1
- Teofilo Spasojević Teofilo 1928/1930 2 0
- Metodije Spasovski Metodije 1968/1969 3 3
- Edin Sprečo Edin 1967/1969 3 2
- Mario Stanić Mario 1991/1991 2 0
- Branko Stanković Branko 1946/1956 61 3
- Dejan Stanković Dejan 1998/2011 102/15
- Jovan Stanković Jovan 1998/2000 10 0
- Vojislav Stanković Vojislav 2010/2010 1/0
- Vujadin Stanojković Vujadin 1988/1992 21 1
- Nenad Starovlah Nenad 1979/1979 2 0
- Dejan Stefanović Dejan 1995/2003 23 0
- Ljubiša Stefanović 1930/1930 4 0
- Milan Stepanov Milan 2006/2007 6 0
- Dragoslav Stepanović Dragoslav 1970/1976 34 1
- Borislav Stevanović Borislav 2001/2001 1 0
- Goran Stevanović Goran 1985/1985 1 0
- Ivan Stevanović Ivan 2007/2007 1 0
- Saša Stevanović 2001/2001 3 0
- Miroslav Stević Miroslav 1998/1998 6 0
- Ivan Stevović Ivan 1933/1939 5 1
- Branko Stinčić Branko 1951/1951 1 0
- Željko Stinčić 1978/1978 1 0
- Nikola Stipić Nikola 1962/1962 1 0
- Aleksandar Stojanović Aleksandar 1979/1979 2 0
- Mirko Stojanović Mirko 1961/1964 4 0
- Slavko Stojanović Slavko 1952/1958 8 0
- Ranko Stojić Ranko 1984/1986 14 0
- Đorđe Stojiljković 1940/1940 3 0
- Dragan Stojković Dragan 1983/2001 84 15
- Nenad Stojković Nenad 1977/1984 32 1
- Vladimir Stojković Vladimir 2006/2012 39/0
- Vlada Stošić Vlada 1990/1990 1 0
- Neven Subotić Neven 2009/2012 30/1
- Miralem Sulejmani Miralem 2008/2012 9/0
- Safet Sušić Safet 1977/1990 54 21
- Sead Sušić Sead 1977/1977 1 0
- Đorđe Svetličić 1997/1998 2 0
- Ratko Svilar Ratko 1976/1983 9 0
- Slavko Svinjarević Slavko 1962/1962 6 0

== Š ==
- Refik Šabanadžović (1986/1990) 8/0
- Nenad Šalov (1980/1980) 1/0
- Ivan Šantek (1956/1958) 6/0
- Dragan Šarac (1998/2004) 6/0
- Bojan Šaranov (2011/2011) 1/0
- Goran Šaula (1994/1996) 9/0
- Stefan Šćepović (2012/2012) 2/0
- Dževad Šećerbegović (1977/1983) 9/0
- Bela Šefer (1924/1924) 1/0
- Dragoslav Šekularac (1956/1966) 41/6
- Miloš Šestić (1979/1985) 21/2
- Jaroslav Šifer (1920/1922) 6/1
- Geza Šifliš (1927/1928) 5/0
- Vasilije Šijaković (1957/1962) 11/0
- Vilim Šipoš (1934/1939) 13/1
- Zlatko Škorić (1964/1966) 8/0
- Haris Škoro (1985/1989) 15/4
- Slobodan Škrbić (1964/1964) 4/0
- Edhem Šljivo (1976/1982) 12/2
- Ivan Šojat (1922/1922) 3/0
- Milutin Šoškić (1959/1966) 50/0
- Franjo Šoštarić (1946/1951) 18/0
- Stjepan Šterk (1922/1922) 1/0
- Davor Šuker (1991/1991) 2/1
- Slavko Šurdonja (1933/1933) 1/0
- Ivica Šurjak (1973/1982) 54/10
- Suad Švraka (1955/1955) 1/0

== T ==
- Dušan Tadić (2008/2012) 4/0
- Silvester Takač (1960/1966) 15/2
- Lazar Tasić (1952/1960) 13/1
- Stanko Tavčar (1920/1920) 2/0
- Anđelko Tešan (1968/1970) 11/0
- Aleksandar Tirnanić (1929/1940) 50/12
- Aleksandar Tomašević (1931/1938) 12/8
- Kosta Tomašević (1946/1951) 10/5
- Đorđe Tomić (1999/1999) 1/0
- Ivan Tomić (1998/2001) 5/0
- Novak Tomić (1958/1963) 5/0
- Nemanja Tomić (2010/2011) 2/1
- Nenad Tomović (2008/2011) 9/0
- Ivan Toplak (1956/1956) 1/0
- Dragan Tošić (1930/1933) 11/0
- Duško Tošić (2006/2012) 11/1
- Rade Tošić (1988/1988) 1/0
- Zoran Tošić (2007/2012) 40/7
- Nikola Trajković (2005/2005) 2/0
- Aleksandar Trifunović (1977/1983) 11/2
- Aleksandar Trišović (2006/2006) 5/1
- Dobrivoje Trivić (1966/1969) 13/0
- Veseljko Trivunović (2010/2011) 6/1
- Goran Trobok (2000/2004) 10/0
- Semir Tuce (1986/1989) 7/2
- Đorđe Tutorić (2007/2007) 1/0

== U ==
- Josip Urbanke (1926/1926) 1/0

== V ==
- Drago Vabec (1973/1976) 7/1
- Svetislav Valjarević (1933/1941) 12/4
- Marko Valok (1949/1950) 6/3
- Miroslav Vardić (1968/1968) 2/0
- Boris Vasković (2002/2002) 3/0
- Velibor Vasović (1961/1966) 32/2
- Franjo Velfl (Franjo Wölfl) (1938/1951) 12/6
- Josip Velker (1938/1940) 3/1
- Vladimir Vermezović (1985/1985) 2/0
- Todor Veselinović (1953/1961) 37/28
- Risto Vidaković (1991/1998) 8/0
- Nemanja Vidić (2002/2011) 56/2
- Blagoje Vidinić (1956/1960) 8/0
- Joško Vidošević (1955/1955) 3/0
- Želimir Vidović (1977/1980) 2/0
- Milan Vilotić (2011/2011) 3/0
- Vladimir Vinek (1922/1924) 6/3
- Dragoslav Virić (1931/1931) 2/0
- Milivoje Vitakić (2004/2004) 2/0
- Franjo Vladić (1972/1977) 24/3
- Fadil Vokri (1984/1987) 12/6
- Vladimir Volkov (2011/2011) 1/0
- Dragutin Vragović (1920/1923) 7/0
- Stjepan Vrbančić (1922/1927) 12/0
- Dragutin Vrđuka (1920/1924) 7/0
- Mirko Vučinić (2005/2006) 3/0
- Budimir Vujačić (1989/1996) 12/0
- Đorđe Vujadinović (1929/1940) 44/18
- Đorđe Vujkov (1977/1977) 4/0
- Svetozar Vujović (1963/1964) 8/0
- Zlatko Vujović (1979/1990) 70/25
- Zoran Vujović (1979/1989) 34/2
- Bernard Vukas (1948/1957) 59/22
- Radomir Vukčević (1967/1971) 9/0
- Simon Vukčević (2004/2005) 5/0
- Milan Vukelić (1957/1964) 3/0
- Zvonimir Vukić (2003/2006) 26/6
- Dragan Vukmir (2004/2004) 1/0
- Nedeljko Vukoje (1966/1966) 1/0
- Branislav Vukosavljević (1949/1949) 2/0
- Momčilo Vukotić (1972/1978) 14/4
- Jagoš Vuković (2009/2009) 2/0
- Zoran Vulić (1986/1991) 25/1
- Miroslav Vulićević (2008/2010) 2/0

== Z ==
- Slavko Zagorac (1932/1938) 7/0
- Velimir Zajec (1977/1985) 36/1
- Bojan Zajić (2004/2008) 2/0
- Slaven Zambata (1962/1968) 31/21
- Ilija Zavišić (1976/1978) 9/0
- Branko Zebec (1951/1961) 65/17
- Dobrivoje Zečević (1931/1938) 18/4
- Miljan Zeković (1952/1955) 13/0
- Josip Zemko (1965/1965) 3/0
- Branko Zinaja (1921/1923) 6/4
- Dušan Zinaja (1923/1923) 1/0
- Saša Zorić (2001/2001) 2/0

== Ž ==
- Ante Žanetić (1959/1960) 15/2
- Nikola Žigić (2004/2011) 57/20
- Dragan Žilić (1998/2003) 8/0
- Todor Živanović (1950/1950) 5/3
- Aleksandar Živković (2001/2001) 2/0
- Aleksandar Živković (1931/1935) 15/15
- Bratislav Živković (1996/1998) 6/0
- Jovan Živković (1930/1930) 1/0
- Zvonko Živković (1982/1985) 5/2
- Slaviša Žungul (1974/1978) 14/0
- Vjekoslav Župančić (1920/1920) 1/0

== Related pages ==
- Yugoslavia national football team
- Serbia national football team
- Football in Yugoslavia
- Football in Serbia

== External sources ==
- Reprezentacija.rs.
- List of FSS players at EU-Football.info
