= FK BASK =

Football club in Belgrade, Serbia

BASK
- Full name: Fudbalski klub BASK
- Founded: 18 April 1903; 123 years ago
- Ground: Careva Ćuprija Stadium
- Capacity: 3,000
- Chairman: Branislav Mirković
- Manager: Nikola Pavlović
- League: Serbian League Belgrade
- 2025-26: Serbian League Belgrade, 12th of 14
- Website: Official
Home colours	Away colours

FK BASK (Serbian Cyrillic: ФК БАСК) is a football club from Savski Venac, Belgrade, Serbia. It is one of the oldest clubs in Serbia. The club currently competes in the Serbian League Belgrade (3rd tier). BASK are the initials of Beogradski Akademski Sport Klub.

== History ==
=== Formation of SK Soko ===
In the Kingdom of Serbia there had been many sports sections and societies, whose members were constantly increasing in number. So in the year of 1891 Belgrade gymnastics society "Soko" was established. One student, Andra Nikolić, became chairmen of the parliament, minister of education and foreign affairs, academic and writer (today in part of Belgrade called Senjak, there is a street named after him, Dr. Andra Nikolić"), together with Hugo Buli, was also the initiator of foundation "The first Serbian association for games with ball", on 1 May 1899. This association for games with ball is considered also the first Serbian football club on territory of ex Yugoslavia and Serbia. Unfortunately, this club had been closed very soon and it disappeared. Nevertheless, it succeeded in organizing one real contest on the new football field built in Guberevac.

Members of Gymnastics association SK Soko continued with ball games, and their enthusiasm had not diminished. They have been gathering on one meadow in Jugovićeva Street. The new younger members had constantly joined them, and then started generation replacement. These lovers of ball decided finally to organize again and once more to establish their own club. On member's gathering, after the usual training, under the open sky on their field, they have founded their club. Among others, unavoidable Hugo Buli, Steva Stefanović, Milan Bajić, Ljuba Jovanović, Mita Đorđević, Mita Stamenković, Boba Marković, Momir Korunović, M.Milosavljević and others were present.

Inaugural meeting was held on 18 April 1903, under the clear sky, on unoccupied lot in Braće Jugovića Street, where in that time was summer playfield Belgrade's gymnastics association Soko.

Assembly's Participants had by acclamation elected Ljubomir Jovanović, who later became minister in governments of Kingdom of Serbia and president of national assembly, and satisfied with the work done, went home. When had met the following day on the playfield, somebody said: “Oh, my God, people, we have founded a club, and nobody had remembered that we should give it a name.” Really, in very big exaltation the previous day they have completely forgotten about that “detail”.

They have assembled again and then they have started making suggestion. People said that this debate had been very long and at some moments also very bitter, until Ljuba Jovanović, newly selected president, did not propose the name “Soko”. The others have all agreed, so on 18 April 1903. of the old calendar, the first football club in Kingdom of Serbia appeared (Bačka from Subotica had been founded in 1901, two years before Soko, but on territory of Austro-Hungary in that time).

=== The early years ===
The first and foremost problem of newly founded club was a playfield. The field in Jugovićeva Street was too tight for the playground so another suitable place in the area known as Bara Venecija was found, between current Belgrade Fair and the main city railway station. However, they could not stay there because the river Sava had risen up, flooded and destroy the playfield. Finally, an adequate playground was found in part of Topčider near of Košutnjak’s forest, in the place of current Range station Topčider. Although the playground was quite far from the city center at that time, "Soko" arranged it well and stayed there for a full 27 years, until the state expropriated it for railway needs.

The stadium got an athletics track and a tribune for standing. Apart from many local games, the first international match in Serbia, between the national team of the Kingdom of Yugoslavia and national team of Romania was played on it, which ended with the victory of the later by 2:1. It was the third international match of the Yugoslavia national team and it was played on 8 May 1922, in the honour of the wedding of King Alexander and Romanian Princes Maria, was attended by over 1,500 spectators, which was remarkable for that time.

In that period the club had difficulties in finding opponents as there were not many existing clubs to play against, so one of the first and the biggest public matches at that period was played among two teams of SK Soko on "St. George´s Day" (Đurđevdan), on May 6, 1904, in the honour of the celebration of the centenary of the First Serbian uprising. In that match (the score is unknown) following players participated: Stevan Stefanović, Milan Bajić, Vladimir Skobla, Dimitrije Đorđević Piperski, Dimitrije Stamenković, Nikola Spasić, Hugo Buli, Vlada Krstić among others. Six months after the club's foundation, Serbian football and engineering pioneer, Danilo Stojanović–Čika Dača, on 14 September 1903, founded the football club Šumadija so Soko got their first domestic rival.

Nevertheless, two years have passed until the match between two oldest clubs in the Kingdom of Serbia took place. On July 20, 1906, Šumadija and Soko met in Kragujevac, and Soko won by 6:1. In the rematch, on August 27, 1906, Soko won again, but this time more convincingly, with the score of 9:0. Unknown chronicle registered that the crown prince himself, George Karađorđević, was also present. For the history of Serbian football, it is very important to mention that these were the first matches played between two domestic clubs. This tradition of the rival matches between FK BASK (former SOKO) and FK Šumadija is held, since 1993, every year on St. George's Day, on May 6, and on Krstovdan, on September 14, when they celebrate their respective holiday Slava´s.

It would be in 1911 and 1912 that Soko would gain the reputation of the strongest club in Serbia and included players such as Čedomir Nedić, Đoka Ilić, Mata Miodragović, Žika Popović, Jovan Viktorović, Elezović, Paja Vukićević and others, which formed the core of the group of the pioneer Serbian football stars.

=== Soko Pro-Roma ===
With the beginning of the First World War most of the footballers replaced the ball with a rifle. In concurrence of events, after the Serbian Army retreat through Albania, very large group of players that formed the club ended up in Rome. Soon, they agreed to renew their club while in the exile, so they joined Italian club Pro-Roma and, as a special section named Soko Pro-Roma, they started playing matches with other Italian clubs. During 1918, as the war drew to its end, Soko Pro-Roma played in the Cup of the city of Rome, and after they defeated all the rivals, many of them renowned Italian football clubs of that period, they won the first place and the first international trophy of Serbian football. The final was played on June 16, 1918, on Piazza Dissiena, and after the triumph of Soko's players, the flag of the Kingdom of Serbia flew high on the mast. Some of the players of that team were Dušan Elezović, Pavle Bajić, Brana Veljković, Jug Nikašinović, Miloš Simović, Milan Miodragović, Svetozar Popović- Kika, Denić, Pavle Lukićević and Živojin Simonović.

=== Domestic competition ===
After the war the club was immediately re-established and continued with work, but the results of the team were alarmingly bad. At beginning, the club was suffering heavy defeats, but this did not discourage the management and players. Their coach until 1926 was Austrian Otto Neczas. A major contribution to the team was the arrival of Czech playmaker Alois Machek from SK Jugoslavija in 1927. In constant struggle with problems, at the end of the second decade of the 20th century, the club was neck to neck with the best Belgrade clubs, BSK and SK Jugoslavija, and in 1929 Soko made started their first triumphs. In the same year, they also successfully played against other Yugoslav First League clubs from Zagreb (Građanski, HAŠK, Concordia) and in Split, in the same year, they defeated Hajduk as well. It was the first defeat of Hajduk on its own playing field and in front of its own public by another club from Yugoslavia.

For the first World Championship in Montevideo, in 1930, SOKO had three of its players in the Yugoslavia national team: Milovan Jakšić, goalkeeper, who with great displays in Uruguay deserved the nickname "El grande Milovan", Milutin Ivković, captain and the best player of the team, and Branislav Hrnjiček, as a reserve player.

=== BASK ===
In 1931 the king Alexander I started promoting Soko societies throughout the country, however by a decree he demanded that Soko societies to be exclusively dedicated to gymnastics. Thus, SK Soko as football club was forced to change their name, and in as assembly held on December 3, 1933, they decided to change their name to BASK, Beogradski amaterski sport klub (Belgrade amateur sport club).

Almost simultaneously, the club ran into another, harder misfortune. Belgrade assembly for the necessities of the railway took away from BASK the playfield in Topčider, so, for some time, the club had no field of their own. Later, BASK got the playing field behind Belgrade electrical plant, which was attributed to Radnički after the Second World War. The resolute management and great team nothing could put out of track. BASK had even struggled for permanent place in competition for the Yugoslav championship, which was played in the begin of 1930s using a cup system. In the 1933 season, BASK was a member of the Yugoslav First League, which had double score system. In competition of 11 teams, BASK took the 5th place behind the champion–BSK, second-standing Hajduk Split, SK Jugoslavija and HAŠK, but in front of notable clubs such as Građanski Zagreb, Concordia, Primorje Ljubljana, Slavija Sarajevo, Slavija Osijek and SK Vojvodina. In the next championship BASK archived 7th place, and in the 1936–37 season, it was 6th once again. Next season, 1937–38, it accomplished the 4th place, and that was the highest achievement of the club, finishing behind the new champion HAŠK, BSK and Građanski.

In the 1938–39 Yugoslav Football Championship the league grew to 12 clubs and BASK finished in 8th place. In the last championship, before the Second World War, the 1939–40 season, two separate qualifying leagues were formed, the Serbian Football League and the Croato-Slovenian League, with 10 clubs each. The final phase of the championship was held with 6 clubs, the 3 the best clubs from each league, however BASK did not get the standing required for the finals as they finished in 9th place in the 1939–40 Serbian League. During the championships prior to the Second World War, BASK had brought out numerous notable players. In addition to the already mentioned Milovan Jakšić, dr Milutin Ivković and Branislav Hrnjiček, there were also Miodrag Ranojević, Stojan Popović, Miroslav Lukić, Đorđe Detlinger, Kolnago Ferante, Aleksandar Tomašević, Mladen Sarić and others. Among all these names, the name of Aleksandar Tomašević should be especially distinguished, because he was one of the main top scorers in the third decade, and in that regard also and the biggest rival of the famous Blagoje "Moša" Marjanović. Tomašević left a deep mark in Yugoslav football as a coach as well in the period after the war. He was the main coach of the three most successful Yugoslav clubs after the war: Partizan, Crvena Zvezda, Hajduk Split, and he was also the founder of Radnički Belgrade.

=== Second World War and aftermath ===
With the beginning of the Second World War and the Axis invasion and partition of Yugoslavia, the German authorities created a puppet state in a reduced Serbia. The Serbian League which was organised by the Belgrade Football Subassociation and which was one of the two qualifying leagues for the Yugoslav championship until 1940, was now the national championship of the new puppet state. BASK had a major fall in their results during this period and failed to make any major results in the competition.

At the end of the war, most of the major existing clubs were disbanded by the new authorities. BASK was no exception. New football collectives were founded, with new names that were more appropriate to new times and circumstances.

In the parts of Belgrade, namely Senjak and Topčider hill, which were the home of BASK, a club named Senjak has been founded, and it competed in regional Belgrade leagues. In this environment was born the idea, that this club could take over the tradition of BASK of gathering young people from that part of the city, especially because the club had got the playfield on the edge of Topčider park, very close to former stadium of SK Soko, where it is today.

The idea, nevertheless, could have not been realized immediately. No sooner than 1953, on 50-anniversary of Soko and BASK, on the Annual assembly, in the presence of many members of the pre-war club, FK Senjak took over the name BASK and all the traditions of this oldest football collective in former Kingdom of Serbia. Milovan Jakšić, "El Grande Milovan" was elected by the assembly as the president of the club. Since then, until 2005, the FK BASK has been competing mostly in the Serbian League Belgrade.

In this period, the biggest success had been the winning of the Cup of the Belgrade liberation in 1958, the victory in the Cup of Yugoslavia in territory of Belgrade football association, and in the same year, the defeat in the final game of Yugoslav Cup for the Serbian territory from FK Borac Čačak. After taking the first in the Belgrade First League in 1971 BASK was promoted to the Serbian League North where it played for most of the later period.

=== Recent history ===
After the break-up of SFR Yugoslavia, BASK has been competing mostly in the second and third national levels. At the beginning of the new millennium BASK was playing in the Serbian League Belgrade. In the season 2000–01 BASK won the Belgrade Cup. In the championship game BASK-Komgrap 1–0 at Radnicki Jugopetrol stadium. As the winner, BASK qualified in Yugoslavia Cup, where it was eliminated in the second round (last 32) against Mladenovac after penalty shootout. In 2005 it will gain promotion to the Second League of Serbia and Montenegro. BASK will finish the season in 11th place, and in the end of the season and with the independence of Montenegro, the league will be renamed into the Serbian First League. BASK finished the 2006–07 season in 18th place and will be relegated again, returning to the First League in 2010 after winning the 2009–10 Serbian League Belgrade. In their first season after the promotion, BASK archive major results, and finished the season as champion of the 2010–11 Serbian First League. This meant the direct promotion to the highest national level, the Serbian SuperLiga, however the club direction decided that they would not be able to guarantee the financial backing for the SuperLiga and thus withdrew leaving their place for FK Novi Pazar which had finished third. Instead, BASK relegated themselves to the Serbian League Belgrade, finishing the 2011–12 season in 13th place.

In 2022, BASK merged with FK TEK Sloga and renamed itself BASK TEK, before reverting back.

=== Recent league history ===
Season	Division	P	W	D	L	F	A	Pts	Pos
2020–21	Serbian League Belgrade	38	16	9	13	43	39	57	12th
2021–22	Serbian League Belgrade	30	18	3	9	57	32	57	4th
2022–23	Serbian League Belgrade	30	10	10	10	40	38	36 (Note: The club was docked four points.)	8th
2023–24	Serbian League Belgrade	30	10	13	7	40	23	40 (Note: The club was docked three points.)	9th
2024–25	Serbian League Belgrade	26	6	6	14	19	45	16 (Note: The club was docked eight points.)	13th

== Name history ==
- SK Soko (1903–33)
- BASK (1933–45)
- FK Senjak (1945–53)
- FK BASK (1953–2022)
- FK BASK TEK (2022–2025)
- FK BASK (2025-)

== Honours ==
- Serbian First League
  - Champions (1): 2010–11
- Serbian League Belgrade
  - Champions (1): 2009–10

== Current squad ==
As of 22 December 2025

Note: Flags indicate national team as defined under FIFA eligibility rules; some limited exceptions apply. Players may hold more than one non-FIFA nationality.

No.	Pos.	Nation	Player
1	GK	SRB	Stefan Marinković
2	DF	SRB	Matija Tošić
4	MF	SRB	Nemanja Petrović
5	DF	SRB	Luka Stupar
6	MF	SRB	Andrej Mladenović
7	FW	SRB	David Milisavljević
8	FW	SRB	Đorđe Panić
9	MF	SRB	Nikša Delibašić
10	MF	SRB	Ignjat Brajić
11	FW	SRB	Stevan Ostojić
12	GK	SRB	Novak Nikolić
13	DF	SRB	Aleksa Marinković
14	MF	SRB	Andrej Panev

No.	Pos.	Nation	Player
15	DF	SRB	Marko Jelić
16	DF	SRB	Boško Vulović
17	FW	SRB	Mateja Bojović
18	FW	SRB	Luka Sandulović
19	MF	SRB	Viktor Rajić
20	DF	SRB	Filip Filipović
21	MF	SRB	Kosta Veselinović
23	DF	SRB	Mihajlo Stojanović
26	FW	SRB	Andrej Žaknić
28	MF	SRB	Stanko Anastasijević
—	DF	SRB	Vuk Mijailović
—	DF	SRB	Petar Radošević

=== Notable players ===
Players with national team appearances

- (Kingdom of Yugoslavia) Ratomir Čabrić
- (Kingdom of Yugoslavia) Kolnago Ferante
- (Kingdom of Yugoslavia) Milutin Ivković
- (Kingdom of Yugoslavia) Milovan Jakšić
- (Kingdom of Yugoslavia) Andreja Kojić
- (Kingdom of Yugoslavia) Miroslav Lukić
- (Kingdom of Yugoslavia) Milorad Mitrović
- (Kingdom of Yugoslavia) Stojan Popović
- (Kingdom of Yugoslavia) Miodrag Ranojević
- (Kingdom of Yugoslavia) Mladen Sarić
- (Kingdom of Yugoslavia) Slavko Šurdonja
- (Kingdom of Yugoslavia) Aleksandar Tomašević
- (Serbia) Milan Biševac
- (Serbia) Dušan Petronijević
- (Serbia) Bojan Zajić
- (Serbia and Montenegro) Borislav Stevanović
- (North Macedonia) Milan Stojanoski
- (Montenegro) Vladimir Rodić

For the list of all current and former players with Wikipedia article, please see: Category:FK BASK players.

== Notable former coaches ==
- (Austria) Otto Neczas (1925–1926)
- (Kingdom of Yugoslavia) Dimitrije Davidović (1931–1932)
- (Kingdom of Yugoslavia) Sima Simić (1932–1934)
- (Kingdom of Yugoslavia) Dimitrije Milojević (1934–1935)
- (Kingdom of Yugoslavia) Milenko Jovanović (1935–1936)
- (Kingdom of Yugoslavia) Milutin Ivković (1936–1937)
- (Austria) Hans Bloch (1937–1938)
- (Kingdom of Yugoslavia) Milutin Ivković (1938–1939)
- (Bosnia and Herzegovina) Simo Krunić (2006–2007)
- (Serbia) Blagoje Paunović (2010–2011)
