= Đorđe Detlinger =

Serbian footballer

Personal information
- Full name: Đorđe Detlinger
- Date of birth: 31 May 1912
- Place of birth: Belgrade, Kingdom of Serbia
- Date of death: 15 April 1978 (aged 65)
- Place of death: Belgrade, SFR Yugoslavia
- Position: Forward

Senior career*
Years	Team	Apps	(Gls)
1929–1930	SK Jugoslavija	4	(1)
1931–1939	BASK	59	(13)

Managerial career
- 19xx–1961: Rudar Kakanj
- 1967–1968: Borac Banja Luka
- * Club domestic league appearances and goals

Đorđe Detlinger (Serbian Cyrillic: Ђорђе Детлингер; 31 May 1912 – 15 April 1978) was a Yugoslav football manager and player.

== Playing career ==
Born in Belgrade, he played with SK Jugoslavija and FK BASK in the Yugoslav Championship. He continues playing with BASK in the 1939–40 Serbian League and 1940–41 Serbian League, scoring a goal in each season.

== Coaching career ==
He coached Rudar Kakanj in the season 1960–61 when the club became champion of the Bosnia and Herzegovina Republic League. The title earned them a place in the play-offs for the Yugoslav Second League after losing against Croatian Republic League champions NK Borovo by 0–8, Detlinger was sacked. He also coached Borac Banja Luka.
