= Teofilo Spasojević =

Serbian footballer (1909-1970)

Personal information
- Date of birth: 21 January 1909
- Place of birth: Belgrade, Kingdom of Serbia
- Date of death: 28 February 1970 (aged 61)
- Place of death: Belgrade, SFR Yugoslavia
- Position: Defender

Youth career
- Jugoslavija

Senior career*
Years	Team	Apps	(Gls)
1925–1931	Jugoslavija		

International career
1928–1930	Kingdom of Yugoslavia	2	(0)
- * Club domestic league appearances and goals

Teofilo Spasojević (Serbian Cyrillic: Теофило Спасојевић; 21 January 1909 – 28 February 1970) was a Serbian football player.

== Biography ==
Playing as a left-back, he was known for his classy, elegant style, correctness and excellent positioning in the field.

He started playing in the youth teams of Belgrade's SK Jugoslavija, where he played most of his career, from 1929 until 1935, making with Milutin Ivković, considered by many as the best full-back of the pre-1941 Yugoslav football, one of the best defences. He played for the club in 110 official matches.

He played twice for the Yugoslavia national football team. His début was on 6 May 1928 in Belgrade against Romania, a 3–1 win, and his other, and last, match was on 3 August 1930, a friendly in Buenos Aires against Argentina, a 1–3 loss, just after the 1930 FIFA World Cup, in which he was part of the team, but didn't play any match. Despite having been a remarkable player, the competition in the defence didn't allow him to have more caps for the national team.

After retiring, he enrolled the Belgrade Law School and has earned a degree. He died in winter of 1970, at 61 years of age.
