= Borislav Stevanović =

Serbian footballer (1975–2022)

Personal information
- Date of birth: 22 September 1975
- Place of birth: Kosovska Mitrovica, SFR Yugoslavia
- Date of death: 24 January 2022 (aged 46)
- Position: Striker

Youth career
- Trepça

Senior career*
Years	Team	Apps	(Gls)
1992–1998	Radnički Niš	101	(28)
1998	Mérida	8	(2)
1998–2003	Rad	106	(46)
2003–2005	Zemun	9	(1)
2005	Universitatea Craiova	1	(0)
2005–2007	BASK	30	(6)
Total		255	(83)

International career
2001	FR Yugoslavia	1	(0)
- * Club domestic league appearances and goals

Borislav Stevanović (22 September 1975 – 24 January 2022) was a Serbian footballer who played at both professional and international levels as a striker.

== Career ==
Stevanović started playing club football for hometown club Trepça and played senior football in Yugoslavia, Spain and Romania for Radnički Niš, Mérida, Rad, Zemun, Universitatea Craiova and BASK.

He also earned one cap for Yugoslavia, at the 2001 Kirin Cup against hosts Japan.

== Personal life ==
Stevanović was born in Kosovska Mitrovica on 22 September 1975. He died on 24 January 2022, at the age of 46.
