= Ferante Colnago =

Croatian footballer

Personal information
- Full name: Ferante Colnago
- Date of birth: 11 July 1907
- Place of birth: Split, Kingdom of Dalmatia, Austro-Hungary
- Date of death: 15 May 1969 (aged 61)
- Place of death: Belgrade, PR Serbia, FPR Yugoslavia
- Position: Defender

Youth career
- 1916–1923: Hajduk Split

Senior career*
Years	Team	Apps	(Gls)
1923–1926	Concordia Zagreb		
1926–1929	Soko Beograd		
1929–1931	Marseille	14	(1)
1931–1938	Rapid București		

International career
1929	Yugoslavia	1	(0)
- * Club domestic league appearances and goals

Ferante Colnago (11 July 1907 – 15 May 1969) was a Croatian footballer who earned one cap for the Yugoslavia national team.

He was sometimes referred to as Ferante Kolnago which is the Serbian spelling.

== Playing career ==
Playing mostly as a central defender he started to play in the youth teams of NK Hajduk Split but failed to debut in the first team. Afterwards, he moved to Zagreb where he signed with HŠK Concordia. It was while he was playing with SK Soko from Belgrade that he played his only match for the Yugoslavia national team. It was on 19 May 1929 in Paris that Yugoslavia had achieved its first win over the "tricolor" by 3-1 and Ferante's brilliant performance on the match did not pass unnoticed, having earned him a call to join, together with Ivica Bek, Olympique de Marseille, where he would play two seasons. Between 1931 and 1938 he played with Rapid București in Romania.

After a heavy injury, he retired and returned to Belgrade where he began working as a bank employee.
