= Zlatko Dračić =

Croatian footballer (born 1940)

Personal information
- Full name: Zlatko Dračić
- Date of birth: 17 November 1940 (age 85)
- Place of birth: Kutina, Kingdom of Yugoslavia
- Position: Forward

Senior career*
Years	Team	Apps	(Gls)
1957–1968	NK Zagreb		
1968	Independiente		
1968–1969	Zwolle		(10)
1969–1970	KSV Sottegem		

International career
1965	Yugoslavia	1	(0)
- * Club domestic league appearances and goals

Zlatko Dračić (born 17 November 1940) is a Croatian retired football player. From 1983 to 1986, he was vice-president of NK Zagreb and from 1989 to 1999 club director.

== Club career ==
He is best known for playing as a prolific forward at NK Zagreb between 1957 and 1968, with whom he became top scorer in the 1964–65 Yugoslav First League, with 23 goals in 26 league appearances.

After leaving NK Zagreb in the late 1960s, he had short stints playing for Independiente in Argentina, Zwolle in the Netherlands, and KSV Sottegem in Belgium.

== International career ==
He was also capped once for Yugoslavia, in a September 1965 friendly against the Soviet Union played in Moscow, coming on as a substitute for Milan Galić.
