= Slavoljub Nikolić =

Serbian footballer

Personal information
- Full name: Slavoljub Nikolić
- Date of birth: 31 January 1960 (age 66)
- Place of birth: Niš, FPR Yugoslavia
- Height: 1.80 m (5 ft 11 in)
- Position: Midfielder

Senior career*
Years	Team	Apps	(Gls)
1978–1987	Radnički Niš	195	(52)
1987–1988	Caen	27	(7)
1988–1990	Nancy	62	(12)
1990–1992	Guingamp	58	(13)
1992–1994	Lyon-Duchère	43	(12)
Total		375	(96)

International career
1982	Yugoslavia	2	(0)
- * Club domestic league appearances and goals

Slavoljub Nikolić (Serbian Cyrillic: Славољуб Николић; born 31 January 1960) is a Serbian retired footballer who played as a midfielder.

He played in two European Championship qualification matches for Yugoslavia in 1982.
