= Ivan Granec =

Croatian footballer (1895–1923)

Personal information
- Date of birth: 8 September 1895
- Place of birth: Zagreb, Kingdom of Croatia-Slavonia, Austria-Hungary
- Date of death: 9 January 1923 (aged 27)
- Place of death: Zagreb, Kingdom of Serbs, Croats and Slovenes
- Position: Midfielder

Senior career*
Years	Team	Apps	(Gls)
1918–1921	Građanski Zagreb	23	(26)

International career
1920	Kingdom of SCS	1	(0)
- * Club domestic league appearances and goals

Ivan "Ivo" Granec (8 September 1895 – 9 January 1923) was a Croatian footballer.

== International career ==
Granec represented Yugoslavia at the 1920 Summer Olympics which were held in Antwerp, in their first round match they were up against Czechoslovakia but they lost 0–7. It remained his sole international appearance.

== Death ==
Granec committed suicide when aged just 27 years old.
