= Jovan Anđelković =

Yugoslav football player

Personal information
- Full name: Jovan Anđelković
- Date of birth: 14 August 1942
- Place of birth: Pirot, Kingdom of Bulgaria
- Date of death: 27 April 1969 (aged 26)
- Place of death: Niš, SFR Yugoslavia
- Position: Midfielder

Senior career*
Years	Team	Apps	(Gls)
1958–1962	Radnički Pirot		
1962–1963	Red Star Belgrade	15	(2)
1963–1968	Radnički Niš	109	(37)

International career
1963–1964	Yugoslavia U19	4	(0)
1964	Yugoslavia U21	1	(1)
1965–1966	Yugoslavia	2	(0)
- * Club domestic league appearances and goals

Jovan Anđelković (Serbian Cyrillic: Јован Анђелковић; 14 August 1942 – 27 April 1969) was a Serbian football midfielder. He was capped twice for the Yugoslavia national team, in two friendlies in 1965 and 1966.

After starting to play with his hometown club FK Radnički Pirot in the Second League, he moved in 1962 to Red Star Belgrade, but after one season, he joined another Yugoslav First League club, FK Radnički Niš.

In 1968, while his career was in full strength, he got ill and died from lung cancer.
