= Vjekoslav Župančić =

Croatian football player

Personal information
- Date of birth: 18 May 1900
- Place of birth: Zagreb, Kingdom of Croatia-Slavonia, Austria-Hungary
- Date of death: 14 February 1971 (aged 70)
- Place of death: Zagreb, SR Croatia, SFR Yugoslavia
- Position: Defender

Senior career*
Years	Team	Apps	(Gls)
1918–1920	HAŠK		
1921–1925	SV Amateure		
1926–1928	HAŠK		

International career
1920	Kingdom of SCS	1	(0)
- * Club domestic league appearances and goals

Vjekoslav Župančić (Вјекослав Жупанчић, 18 May 1900 – 14 February 1971) was a Yugoslav footballer. He was born and died in Zagreb.

== International career ==
He competed for the Kingdom of Serbs, Croats and Slovenes at the 1920 Summer Olympics, earning his only cap in a game against Czechoslovakia.
