= Fahrija Dautbegović =

Bosnian-Herzegovinian footballer (born 1943)

Personal information
- Date of birth: 15 November 1943 (age 82)
- Place of birth: Donji Vakuf, Independent State of Croatia
- Position: Goalkeeper

Senior career*
Years	Team	Apps	(Gls)
1964–1967	Rudar Kakanj		
1967–1973	Dinamo Zagreb	172	(0)
1973–1974	1860 Munich	30	(0)
1974–1975	Olimpija Ljubljana	8	(0)
1975–1977	Sarajevo	44	(0)
1977–1979	Iskra Bugojno	46	(0)
Total		300	(0)

International career
1969–1970	Yugoslavia	2	(0)
- * Club domestic league appearances and goals

Fahrija Dautbegović (born 15 November 1943) is a Bosnian-Herzegovinian former professional footballer who played as a goalkeeper. Best known for his six years with Dinamo Zagreb where he was a member of the starting lineup between 1967 and 1972, he was also capped twice for Yugoslavia.

== Club career ==
Dautbegović began his career at Rudar Kakanj, from where he joined Dinamo Zagreb in 1967. He then played for 1860 Munich before coming back to SFR Yugoslavia with NK Olimpija, FK Sarajevo and NK Iskra Bugojno.

== International career ==
Dautbegović made his debut for Yugoslavia in a September 1969 friendly match against the Soviet Union and earned a total of two caps. His second and final international was a November 1970 friendly against West Germany.
