= Ante Jurić (footballer, born 1934) =

Croatian footballer

Personal information
- Full name: Ante Jurić
- Date of birth: 21 February 1934
- Place of birth: Split, Kingdom of Yugoslavia
- Date of death: 4 September 2013 (aged 79)
- Place of death: Split, Croatia
- Position: Goalkeeper

Youth career
- Jedinstvo Kopilica

Senior career*
Years	Team	Apps	(Gls)
1955–1964	Hajduk Split	92	(0)
1964–1965	Arsenal Split		
1965–1972	Uskok Split		

International career
1959	Yugoslavia	1	(0)
- * Club domestic league appearances and goals

Ante Jurić (1 February 1934 – 4 September 2013) was a Yugoslav professional footballer who played as a goalkeeper for Hajduk Split.

== Club career ==
Jurić began his career with Jedinstvo Kopilica, before joining NK Hajduk Split at the age of 19. He made his first appearance for Hajduk on 4 December 1955, against BSK Beograd (which finished as a 0–2 defeat). He made 243 appearances for Hajduk (91 league matches, 11 cup ties and 141 friendlies), scoring once.

In 1964, he transferred to Arsenal Split in second tier of the Yugoslav football system. One season later, he was signed to Uskok Split in the third tier of Yugoslavia. He played there until he reached the age of 38.

== International career ==
Jurić was capped once for Yugoslavia on 26 April 1959, in a friendly against Switzerland in Basel (which finished as a 5–1 win). This match was his only appearance for Yugoslavia, as a medical examination allegedly revealed a "shadow in his lung", the player was benched by his club for six months. Years later Jurić learned from viable sources that the diagnosis was misleading, possibly initiated due to his public wearing of Christian symbols.

== Personal life ==
Jurić was married and fathered two daughters, Ines and Željana.
