= Branimir Porobić =

Serbian footballer

Personal information
- Date of birth: 5 January 1901
- Place of birth: Belgrade, Kingdom of Serbia
- Date of death: 18 December 1952 (aged 51)
- Place of death: Osnabrück, West Germany
- Position: Defender

Youth career
- Lyon
- 1918: BSK

Senior career*
Years	Team	Apps	(Gls)
1919	BSK		
1919–1921	BUSK		
1921–1926	BSK		
1919–1924	SK Jugoslavija		

International career
1920	Kingdom of Serbs, Croats and Slovenes	1	(0)
- * Club domestic league appearances and goals

Branimir Porobić (Serbian Cyrillic: Бранимир Поробић; 5 January 1901 – 18 December 1952) was a Yugoslav and Serbian footballer. He was one of the pioneers of Serbian football as one of the founders of BUSK and a member of the club direction of BSK.

== Biography ==
Born in Belgrade, he escaped to France during World War I where he finished high-school and played there in Lyon. When he returned to Belgrade he joined BSK in 1918 and played as a full-back. He debuted for the first team of BSK in 1919. That year he moved to another Belgrade club, BUSK, but in 1921 he returned to giants BSK bringing with him two of his BUSK teammates, Aleksandar Milošević and Dušan Zdravković. He played with BSK until 1926.

He was part of the first Yugoslavia national team squad which was gathered to play in the 1920 Summer Olympics and he played in the second match on September 2, 1920 against Egypt. He also played 7 matches for the Belgrade Football Subassociation selection.

He was a member of the BSK direction board, and was one of the founders and a number 1 member of another club, BUSK. During World War II he was an officer in the French Army in the French occupation zone in the Allied-occupied Germany.

He died in Osnabrück, West Germany, on December 18, 1952.
