= Edvard Hočevar =

Slovenian footballer

Personal information
- Date of birth: 31 May 1926
- Date of death: 1 February 1998 (aged 71)
- Position: Striker

Senior career*
Years	Team	Apps	(Gls)
1950	Partizan	4	(2)
1951–1959	Odred Ljubljana		

International career
1950	Yugoslavia	1	(1)
- * Club domestic league appearances and goals

Edvard Hočevar (31 May 1926 – 1 February 1998) was a Yugoslav footballer.

== Club career ==
He was a forward and he played with FK Partizan in the Yugoslav First League. He also played with NK Olimpija ljubljana (named NK Odred at time) in the 1958–59 Yugoslav Second League.

== International career ==
Hočevar played one match and scored once for the Yugoslavia national team in a friendly match against Denmark played on 28 May 1950 (a 5–1 win).
