= Josip Čop =

Croatian footballer

Personal information
- Date of birth: 14 October 1954 (age 72)
- Place of birth: Varaždin, FPR Yugoslavia
- Position: Defender

Senior career*
Years	Team	Apps	(Gls)
1975–1976	Varteks		
1976–1983	NK Zagreb	140	(6)
1983–1984	Hajduk Split	28	(0)
1984–1986	Sturm Graz	57	(3)
1986–1988	NK Zagreb		
1988–1994	SV Wildon		

International career
1984	Yugoslavia	2	(0)
- * Club domestic league appearances and goals

Josip Čop (born 14 October 1954) is a Croatian retired footballer.

== Club career ==
During his club career he played for NK Varteks, NK Zagreb, NK Hajduk Split and SK Sturm Graz.

== International career ==
He made his debut for Yugoslavia in a June 1984 friendly match against Portugal, a preparation game for UEFA Euro 1984, and earned a total of 2 caps, scoring no goals. His second and final international was five days later against Spain. He was a non-playing squad member at Euro 84.

== Post-playing career ==
He began his career in sport management as the Secretary General of the Football Federation of Croatia, FIFA delegate and UEFA delegate, as well as member of several UEFA committees (Stadium and Security Committee; Delegate Panel; Venue Director Panel; European Championship Committee U 21) and vice president of the UEFA European Championship Committee U 21.

From 1996 to 1998 Čop served as Secretary-General of the Croatian Football Federation. Since 2005, he is the Secretary-General of the Croatian Olympic Committee, currently serving his third four-year term.
