= Milorad Mitrović (footballer, born 1908) =

Serbian footballer (1908–1993)

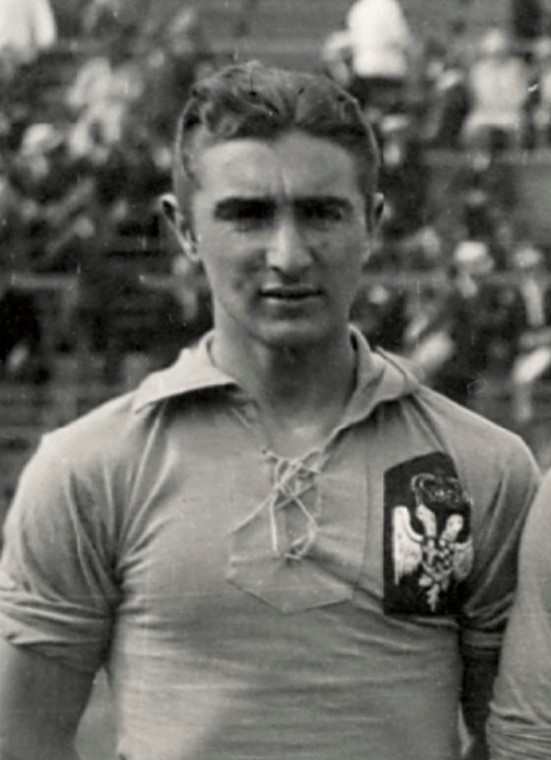
- Mitrović in 1928

Personal information
- Date of birth: 12 April 1908
- Place of birth: Veliko Gradište, Kingdom of Serbia
- Date of death: 9 August 1993 (aged 85)
- Place of death: Split, Croatia
- Position: Defender

Senior career*
Years	Team	Apps	(Gls)
1926–1928	BSK	9	(0)
1928–1932	Montpellier		
1933–1934	Sète	5	(0)
1934–1937	BSK	24	(0)
1938–1939	BASK	21	(0)

International career
1928–1935	Yugoslavia	3	(0)

Managerial career
- 1955–1959: Burma
- * Club domestic league appearances and goals

Milorad Mitrović (12 April 1908 – 9 August 1993) was a Serbian football defender who played for Yugoslavia at the 1928 Summer Olympics. He also played two matches at the Balkan Cup.

For family reasons he moved to Split where he lived until his death.
