= Slavko Svinjarević =

Yugoslav and Serbian footballer

Personal information
- Full name: Slavko Svinjarević
- Date of birth: 6 April 1935
- Place of birth: Sremski Karlovci, Kingdom of Yugoslavia
- Date of death: 2006 (aged 70–71)
- Height: 1.78 m (5 ft 10 in)
- Position: Defender

Youth career
- Stražilovo
- 1954–1955: Vojvodina

Senior career*
Years	Team	Apps	(Gls)
1955–1965	Vojvodina	165	(0)
1965–1969	Wormatia Worms	109	(1)
Total		274	(1)

International career
1962	Yugoslavia	6	(0)
- * Club domestic league appearances and goals

Slavko Svinjarević (Serbian Cyrillic: Славко Свињаревић; 6 April 1935 – 2006) was a Yugoslav and Serbian footballer who played as a defender.

== Career ==
Svinjarević played for Vojvodina between 1955 and 1965, making 165 appearances in the Yugoslav First League. He subsequently moved abroad to Germany and joined Wormatia Worms, spending the next four seasons at the club.

At international level, Svinjarević was capped six times for Yugoslavia. He represented his country at the 1962 FIFA World Cup in Chile.
