= Anđelko Marušić =

Croatian footballer

Personal information
- Full name: Anđelko Marušić
- Date of birth: 11 January 1911
- Place of birth: Omiš, Kingdom of Dalmatia, Austria-Hungary
- Date of death: 5 October 1981 (aged 70)
- Place of death: Zagreb, SR Croatia, Yugoslavia
- Position: Midfielder

Senior career*
Years	Team	Apps	(Gls)
1929–1941	Hajduk Split	176	(3)
Total		176	(3)

International career
1930-1935	Yugoslavia	16	(0)
- * Club domestic league appearances and goals

Anđelko Marušić (1 January 1911 – 5 October 1981) was a Yugoslav professional footballer. He spent his senior career with Hajduk Split, also making 16 appearances for the Yugoslavia national team.

== Honours ==
=== Player ===
Hajduk Split

- Banovina of Croatia: 1940–41
