= Branko Bošnjak (footballer) =

Bosnia and Herzegovina footballer

Personal information
- Full name: Branislav Bošnjak
- Date of birth: 11 October 1955 (age 71)
- Place of birth: Sarajevo, SR Bosnia, SFR Yugoslavia
- Height: 1.75 m (5 ft 9 in)
- Position: Midfielder

Senior career*
| Years | Team | Apps | (Gls) |
| 1974–1979 | Sarajevo | 123 | (7) |
| 1979–1983 | Olimpija Ljubljana | 101 | (7) |
| 1983–1984 | Dinamo Zagreb | 22 | (1) |
| 1984–1985 | Olimpija Ljubljana | 16 | (0) |
| 1985–1987 | Kayserispor | 53 | (5) |
| 1987–1988 | Olimpija Ljubljana | 29 | (2) |
| Total | | 344 | (22) |

International career
| 1983 | Yugoslavia | 1 | (0) |
- * Club domestic league appearances and goals

Branko Bošnjak (born 11 October 1955) is a former Yugoslav international football midfielder who played in the former Yugoslavia and Turkey.

== Club career ==
Born in Sarajevo, Bosnia, Bošnjak started playing football for local side FK Sarajevo in the Yugoslav First League. He would join fellow First League side NK Olimpija Ljubljana in 1979. In 1985, Bošnjak moved to Turkey, joining Kayserispor for two seasons. He would make 28 Süper Lig appearances for the club.

== International career ==
Bošnjak made one appearance for the senior Yugoslavia national football team, entering as a substitute in a friendly against Romania on 1 June 1983.
