= Vladimir Klaić =

Croatian football player (1925–1970)

Personal information
- Full name: Vladimir Klaić
- Date of birth: 14 September 1925
- Place of birth: Zagreb, Zagreb Oblast, Kingdom of Serbs, Croats and Slovenes
- Date of death: 5 September 1970 (aged 44)
- Place of death: Zagreb, SR Croatia, SFR Yugoslavia
- Position: Midfielder

Senior career*
Years	Team	Apps	(Gls)
1942–1945	Kvaternik Zagreb		
1946–1949	Milicioner Zagreb		
1950–1951	Borac Zagreb	22+	(0+)
1952–1959	NK Zagreb	115	(1)
Total		137+	(1+)

International career
1953	Yugoslavia	1	(0)
1956	PR Croatia	1	(0)
- * Club domestic league appearances and goals

Vladimir "Glavica" Klaić (14 September 1925 – 5 September 1970) was a Croatian and Yugoslav footballer who played as a midfielder and made one appearance for both the Yugoslavia and Croatia national teams.

== International career ==
Klaić earned his first and only cap for Yugoslavia on 16 January 1953 in a friendly against Egypt. The away match, which was played in Cairo, finished as a 1–3 loss. Three years later, he made an appearance for PR Croatia in the team's 1956 friendly match against Indonesia. The fixture, which was played on 12 September in Zagreb, finished as a 5–2 win for Croatia.

== Personal life ==
Klaić died on 5 September 1970 in Zagreb at the age of 44.

== Career statistics ==
=== International ===
Team	Year	Apps	Goals
Yugoslavia	1953	1	0
Yugoslavia	Total	1	0
PR Croatia	1956	1	0
PR Croatia	Total	1	0
Career total		2	0
