= Dragutin Najdanović =

Yugoslav footballer

Personal information
- Date of birth: 15 April 1908
- Place of birth: Belgrade, Kingdom of Serbia
- Date of death: 3 November 1981 (aged 73)
- Place of death: Belgrade, SFR Yugoslavia
- Position: Forward

Senior career*
Years	Team	Apps	(Gls)
1924-1931	BSK Belgrade		
1942–1944	Balkan Belgrade		

International career
1930	Kingdom of Yugoslavia	4	(1)
- * Club domestic league appearances and goals

Dragutin Najdanović (15 April 1908 – 3 November 1981) was a Yugoslav football forward who played four games in the Yugoslav national team, including one at the 1930 FIFA World Cup.

He was born and died in Belgrade. At the club level, Najdanović played for BSK Belgrade (now OFK Beograd). During World War II he played with Balkan Belgrade.
