= Stjepan Vrbančić =

Croatian footballer

Personal information
- Date of birth: 29 November 1900
- Place of birth: Zagreb, Kingdom of Croatia-Slavonia, Austria-Hungary
- Date of death: 12 December 1988 (aged 88)
- Place of death: Zagreb, SR Croatia, SFR Yugoslavia
- Position: Defender

Senior career*
Years	Team	Apps	(Gls)
1918–1926	HAŠK		
1926–1935	HŠK Concordia		

International career
1922–1924	Yugoslavia	12	(0)
- * Club domestic league appearances and goals

Stjepan Vrbančić (29 November 1900 – 12 December 1988) was a Croatian footballer. He played with Zagreb's top football clubs: with HAŠK from 1918 to 1926 and HŠK Concordia Zagreb from 1926 to 1935.

== International career ==
Vrbančić made his debut for Yugoslavia in a June 1922 friendly match against Czechoslovakia and earned a total of 12 caps, scoring no goals. He played with the team at the 1924 Summer Olympics. His final international was an April 1927 friendly against Hungary.
