= Branislav Drobnjak =

Montenegrin footballer (1961–2026)

Personal information
- Date of birth: 16 March 1961
- Place of birth: Bijelo Polje, PR Montenegro, FPR Yugoslavia
- Date of death: 25 July 2026 (aged 65)
- Position: Defender

Youth career
- 1975–1978: Jedinstvo Bijelo Polje

Senior career*
| Years | Team | Apps | (Gls) |
| 1978–1979 | Jedinstvo Bijelo Polje | 13 | (1) |
| 1979–1989 | Budućnost Titograd | 202 | (5) |
| 1979–1980 | → OFK Titograd (loan) | 14 | (2) |
| 1989–1990 | TuS Graz | | |

International career
| | Yugoslavia U20 | 8 | (0) |
| 1982–1983 | Yugoslavia U23 | | |
| 1983 | Yugoslavia | 1 | (0) |
- * Club domestic league appearances and goals

Branislav Drobnjak (Serbian Cyrillic: Бранислав Дробњак; 16 March 1961 – 25 July 2026) was a Yugoslav and Montenegrin footballer who played as a defender.

== International career ==
Drobnjak made his debut for Yugoslavia in a December 1983 European Championship qualification match against Wales. It remained his sole international appearance.

== Death ==
Drobnjak died on 25 July 2026, at the age of 65.
