= Branislav Hrnjiček =

Serbian footballer and manager

Personal information
- Full name: Branislav Hrnjiček
- Date of birth: 5 June 1908
- Place of birth: Belgrade, Kingdom of Serbia
- Date of death: 2 July 1964 (aged 56)
- Place of death: Belgrade, SFR Yugoslavia
- Position: Midfielder

Youth career
- SK Jugoslavija

Senior career*
| Years | Team | Apps | (Gls) |
| 1927–1929 | SK Jugoslavija | 8 | (3) |
| 1932–1933 | BASK | 17 | (10) |

International career
| 1929–1930 | Kingdom of Yugoslavia | 5 | (1) |

Managerial career
- 1953–1954: Željezničar Sarajevo
- 1959–1960: Sloga Kraljevo
- 1962: Sloga Kraljevo
- * Club domestic league appearances and goals

Branislav Hrnjiček (Serbian Cyrillic: Бранислав Хрњичек; 5 June 1908 – 2 July 1964) was a Serbian football player and manager.

== Playing career ==
He spent all of his playing career in Belgrade, having played mostly for SK Jugoslavija; the exception being the two seasons he spent playing between 1930 and 1932 with BASK.

He played a total of five matches for the Yugoslavia national football team and scored once. His debut was in a Balkan Cup match on 6 October 1929, against Romania in Bucharest, a 2–1 loss, and his last match was in a friendly against Argentina on 3 August 1930, in Buenos Aires, a 3–1 loss. His only goal was in a match against Bulgaria in a 6–1 win. He was part of the Yugoslav team in the 1930 FIFA World Cup, but did not play a single match.

== Post-playing career ==
After ending his playing career, he worked as a football coach for some period in Israel. He died at 56 years of age, while preparing to continue his coaching career in West Germany.
