= Đuka Agić =

Croatian footballer

Personal information
- Full name: Đuro Agić
- Date of birth: 17 August 1906
- Place of birth: Zagreb, Austria-Hungary
- Date of death: 15 January 1985 (aged 78)
- Place of death: Zagreb, SFR Yugoslavia
- Position: Defender

Senior career*
Years	Team	Apps	(Gls)
1925–1931	HAŠK Zagreb		

International career
1930	Kingdom of Yugoslavia	1	(0)
- * Club domestic league appearances and goals

Đuro "Đuka" Agić (17 August 1906 – 15 January 1985) was a Croatian footballer.

== International career ==
He made his debut for the Kingdom of Yugoslavia in a January 1930 Balkan Cup match against Greece, which remained his sole international game.
