= Nedeljko Vukoje =

Croatian footballer

Personal information
- Full name: Nedeljko Vukoje
- Date of birth: 9 September 1943 (age 83)
- Place of birth: Fiume, Kingdom of Italy
- Position: Forward

Senior career*
Years	Team	Apps	(Gls)
1961–1970	Rijeka	143	(32)
1971–1972	Freiburger FC	2	(0)

International career
1966	Yugoslavia	1	(0)
- * Club domestic league appearances and goals

Nedeljko Vukoje (born September 9, 1943) is a Croatian-born Yugoslav retired football player.

== Club career ==
As a player, he spent most of his career with HNK Rijeka, where he collected 143 caps and scored 32 goals. He was Rijeka's top scorer during the 1965-66 season. In July 1971 he moved to Germany, where he played for Freiburger FC.

== International career ==
He has had one appearance for the Yugoslavia national team (a friendly match against Bulgaria) in June 1966.

== Honours ==
NK Rijeka

- Yugoslav Second League: 1969-70
