= Dragutin Friedrich =

Croatian footballer

Personal information
- Date of birth: 5 January 1897
- Place of birth: Koprivnica, Kingdom of Croatia-Slavonia, Austria-Hungary
- Date of death: 26 March 1980 (aged 83)
- Place of death: Zagreb, SR Croatia, SFR Yugoslavia
- Position: Goalkeeper

Senior career*
Years	Team	Apps	(Gls)
- HŠK Slaven
1922-1928	HAŠK		

International career
1922–1927	Kingdom of SCS	9	(0)
- * Club domestic league appearances and goals

Dragutin Friedrich (5 January 1897 – 26 March 1980) was a Croatian footballer who represented the national team of the Kingdom of Serbs, Croats and Slovenes at the 1924 Summer Olympics, but he did not play in any matches.

== International career ==
He made his debut for Yugoslavia in a June 1922 King Alexandru's Cup match against Romania and earned a total of 9 caps, scoring no goals. His final international was an April 1927 friendly match away against Hungary.
