= Nikola Babić (footballer) =

Croatian footballer (1905–1974)

Personal information
- Date of birth: 5 December 1905
- Place of birth: Sveti Juraj, Austria-Hungary
- Date of death: 22 October 1974 (aged 68)
- Place of death: Mali Lošinj, Yugoslavia

Senior career*
Years	Team	Apps	(Gls)
1927–1928	Građanski	17	(10)
1929	Rapid Wien	2	(0)
1929–1932	HAŠK		
1932–1933	Concordia		

International career
1928–1932	Yugoslavia	3	(0)
- * Club domestic league appearances and goals

Nikola Babić (5 December 1905 – 22 October 1974) was a Croatian footballer.

== International career ==
He made his debut for Yugoslavia in an April 1928 friendly match against Turkey and earned a total of 3 caps scoring no goals. His final international was a May 1932 friendly away against Portugal.
