= Milovan Jakšić =

Serbian footballer

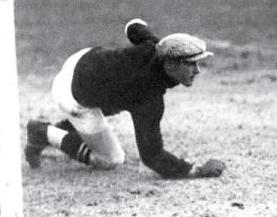
- Jakšić with Kingdom of Yugoslavia in 1930

Personal information
- Full name: Milovan Jakšić
- Date of birth: 21 September 1909
- Place of birth: Kolašin, Principality of Montenegro
- Date of death: 25 December 1953 (aged 44)
- Place of death: Alexandria, Republic of Egypt
- Height: 1.76 m (5 ft 9 in)
- Position: Goalkeeper

Senior career*
Years	Team	Apps	(Gls)
1930–1939	BASK		
1934–1935	→ Slavia Prague (loan)		
1931–1932	→ Ilirija		
- SK Ljubljana

International career
1930–1934	Kingdom of Yugoslavia	9	(0)
- * Club domestic league appearances and goals

Milovan Jakšić (Serbian Cyrillic: Милован Јакшић; 21 September 1909 – 25 December 1953) was a Yugoslav football goalkeeper.

Remembered mostly as El Grande Milovan, the nickname he earned for his excellent saves in the game that Yugoslavia won against Brasil in the First World Cup in Uruguay 1930 FIFA World Cup. He is considered one of the major contributors for Yugoslavia reaching the semi-finals in that tournament.

== Club career ==
Being of medium stature, but very strong physically, Jakšić's main characteristics were his bravure and excellent reflexes. Jakšić spent most of his career playing in FK BASK, named SK Soko before 1931, where he played until 1939. The only exceptions were the Czechoslovak SK Slavia Praha, where Jakšić played a few months of the 1934–35 season, and SK Ljubljana and ND Ilirija at the end of his career.

== International career ==
Jakšić played a total of nine matches for the Yugoslavia national football team. His debut was on 13 April 1930, in a friendly game against Bulgaria in Belgrade, a 6–1 win, and his fairway match was on 2 September 1934, another friendly game, this time in Prague, against Czechoslovakia, a 3–1 loss. Despite all the competition that he faced for the national team goalkeeping place, Jakšić was selected to be the main goalkeeper at the 1930 World Cup. Having displayed magnificent exhibitions in all the matches at the tournament, it is specially remembered by his contributions in the match against Brazil, and it was after that match, that the delighted journalists started calling him by his new nickname: "El Grande Milovan".

== Post-playing career ==
After retiring, Jakšić stayed connected to football. After the World War II, in March 1945, Jakšić was also the President of the Football Coaching Federation of Yugoslavia, from 1950 until the end of 1953, when he died unexpectedly of a heart-attack during a football tournament in Cairo, Egypt, where he accompanied Red Star Belgrade.
