= Petar Georgijevski =

Macedonian footballer

Personal information
- Date of birth: 16 May 1960 (age 66)
- Place of birth: Bitolj, FPR Yugoslavia
- Position: Midfielder

Senior career*
Years	Team	Apps	(Gls)
1980–1989	Vardar	197	(23)
1989–1991	Gueugnon	22	(4)
Total		219	(27)

International career
1984	Yugoslavia	1	(0)
- * Club domestic league appearances and goals

Petar Georgijevski (born 16 May 1960 in Yugoslavia) is a Macedonian retired football player. He capped once for Yugoslavia.

== International career ==
He made his senior debut for Yugoslavia in a September 1984 friendly match away against Scotland, coming on as a second-half substitute for Darko Pančev. It proved to be his sole international appearance.
