= Bela Šefer =

Yugoslav footballer

Personal information
- Date of birth: 11 September 1899
- Place of birth: Novi Sad, Austria-Hungary
- Date of death: 14 July 1971 (aged 71)
- Place of death: Novi Sad, SFR Yugoslavia
- Position: Midfielder

Senior career*
Years	Team	Apps	(Gls)
-1924	NTK Novi Sad		
1924–1929	NAK Novi Sad		
1929-	Juda Makabi		

International career
1924	Kingdom of SCS	1	(0)
- * Club domestic league appearances and goals

Bela Šefer (Serbian Cyrillic: Бела Шефер) (11 September 1899 — 14 July 1971) was a Yugoslav footballer.

He was a forward and he played one match in the Yugoslavia national team, named Kingdom of Serbs, Croats and Slovenes at the time. It was afriendly match played on 10 February 1924, against Austria, a 1–4 defeat. That year he was playing with NAK Novi Sad. He joined NAK in 1924 coming from NTK Novi Sad. In 1929 he was playing with SK Juda Makabi.
