= Mladen Sarić =

Serbian footballer and manager

Personal information
- Date of birth: 16 April 1911
- Place of birth: Belgrade, Kingdom of Serbia
- Date of death: 19 March 1997 (aged 85)
- Place of death: Belgrade, FR Yugoslavia
- Position: Midfielder

Youth career
- 1928: SK Soko

Senior career*
Years	Team	Apps	(Gls)
1931–1939	BASK	85	(21)

International career
1938	Yugoslavia	1	(0)

Managerial career
- 1972: Zemun
- 1973: Serbian White Eagles
- * Club domestic league appearances and goals

Mladen Sarić (16 April 1911 – 19 March 1997) was a Serbian footballer and coach.

== Club career ==
Sarić played at the youth level in 1928 with SK Soko. In 1931, he played in the Yugoslav Football Championship with FK BASK, and played seven seasons with the club. In 1973, he was named the head coach for the Serbian White Eagles in the National Soccer League.

== International career ==
Sarić made his debut for the Yugoslavia national football team on 8 May 1938 against Romania.
