= Petar Lončarević =

Serbian footballer

Personal information
- Date of birth: 20 November 1907
- Place of birth: Belgrade, Kingdom of Serbia
- Date of death: 30 March 1978 (aged 70)
- Place of death: Kranj, SR Slovenia, SFR Yugoslavia
- Height: 1.90 m (6 ft 3 in)
- Position: Centre back

Youth career
- 1925–1929: Jugoslavija

Senior career*
Years	Team	Apps	(Gls)
1929–1931	Jugoslavija		
1935–1940	Jedinstvo Belgrade		

International career
1930	Kingdom of Yugoslavia	2	(0)
- * Club domestic league appearances and goals

Petar Lončarević (Serbian Cyrillic: Петар Лончаревић; 20 November 1907 – 30 March 1978) was a Serbian footballer who played two matches for the Kingdom of Yugoslavia national team in 1930.

While attending a Yugoslav First League match between Olimpija Ljubljana and Hajduk Split in the spring of 1978, he got into an argument with fans of the Ljubljana team and one of them struck him in the head with a blunt object. He lost consciousness and was hospitalized where he was placed in a coma. After not regaining consciousness, he died seventeen days later at the age of 70.
