= Mija Jovanović =

Serbian footballer)

Personal information
- Date of birth: 9 October 1907
- Place of birth: Belgrade, Kingdom of Serbia
- Date of death: 26 June 1982 (aged 74)
- Place of death: Belgrade, SFR Yugoslavia
- Position: Midfielder

Senior career*
Years	Team	Apps	(Gls)
1929–1930	Jedinstvo Beograd		
1930–1932	BSK Beograd		

International career
1930–1931	Kingdom of Yugoslavia	3	(0)
- * Club domestic league appearances and goals

Mija Jovanović (Serbian Cyrillic: Мија Јовановић; 9 October 1907 – 26 June 1982) was a Serbian footballer.

== Biography ==
Born in Belgrade, Kingdom of Serbia, he played with SK Jedinstvo Beograd until 1930 when he moved to BSK Beograd. In 1931 he debuted for BSK first team as a center midfielder rendering Sava Marinković. Two years later he would become a right winger. He won the 1930–31 Yugoslav Football Championship with BSK.

== International career ==
Jovanović made his debut for Yugoslavia in a June 1930 friendly match away against Bulgaria and played two matches for them at the Balkan Cup.

He died in Belgrade on 26 June 1982.
