= Suad Švraka =

Personal information
- Date of birth: 6 October 1927
- Place of birth: Sarajevo, Kingdom of SCS
- Date of death: 24 August 1995 (aged 67)
- Place of death: Sarajevo, Republic of BiH
- Position: Defender

Senior career*
Years	Team	Apps	(Gls)
1947–1959	FK Sarajevo	411	(13)
1960–1962	Borac Banja Luka	78	(4)

International career
1955	Yugoslavia	1	(0)
- * Club domestic league appearances and goals

Suad Švraka (6 October 1927 – 24 August 1995) was a Bosnian and Yugoslav professional footballer. He was a member of FK Sarajevo from 1947 to 1959, before joining Borac Banja Luka for two seasons. He is the seventh most capped player in FK Sarajevo history.

== International career ==
He represented Yugoslavia internationally, earning one cap against Scotland in 1955.

== Personal life ==
Švraka died on 24 August 1995 in Sarajevo during the Bosnian War. He was hit by a grenade while on his way home from the grounds of FK Sarajevo, 100 metres (330 ft) from the club building.
