= Zoran Jelikić =

Serbian footballer

Personal information
- Date of birth: August 4, 1953 (age 73)
- Place of birth: Šabac, FPR Yugoslavia
- Position: Defender

Senior career*
Years	Team	Apps	(Gls)
1973–1974	Mačva Šabac	0	(0)
1974–1981	Red Star Belgrade	127	(7)
1981–1983	Hajduk Split	40	(1)
1983–1988	Standard de Liège	76	(5)

International career
1976–1983	Yugoslavia	8	(0)
- * Club domestic league appearances and goals

Zoran Jelikić (Serbian Cyrillic: Зоран Јеликић; born August 4, 1954) is a Serbian retired football player.

== International career ==
Jelikić made his debut for Yugoslavia in a September 1976 friendly match away against Italy and earned a total of 8 caps (no goals). His final international was a June 1983 friendly against West Germany.
