= Eugen Plazzeriano =

Croatian footballer (1897–1972)

Personal information
- Full name: Eugen Emil Plazzeriano
- Date of birth: 3 December 1897
- Place of birth: Zagreb, Kingdom of Croatia-Slavonia, Austria-Hungary
- Date of death: 6 November 1972 (aged 74)
- Place of death: Zagreb, SR Croatia, SFR Yugoslavia
- Position: Forward

Senior career*
Years	Team	Apps	(Gls)
1919–1928	HAŠK		

International career
1924	Kingdom of Serbs, Croats and Slovenes	1	(0)
- * Club domestic league appearances and goals

Eugen Emil Plazzeriano (3 December 1897 – 6 November 1972) was a Croatian footballer. He competed in the men's tournament at the 1924 Summer Olympics. Born in Zagreb, he spent his entire career between 1919 until 1928 playing as forward with HAŠK.

== International career ==
He made his debut and played his sole international match for Yugoslavia in a May 1924 Olympic Games match against Uruguay.
