= Slobodan Anđelković =

Serbian footballer

Personal information
- Full name: Слободан Анђелковић
- Date of birth: 1 March 1913
- Place of birth: Belgrade, Kingdom of Serbia
- Date of death: 6 December 1985 (aged 72)
- Place of death: Sombor, SFR Yugoslavia
- Position: Defender

Senior career*
Years	Team	Apps	(Gls)
1935–1941	Jugoslavija		

International career
1937	Yugoslavia	1	(0)

Managerial career
- Hajduk Kula
- * Club domestic league appearances and goals

Slobodan Anđelković (Serbian Cyrillic: Слободан Анђелковић; 1 March 1913 – 6 December 1985) was a Yugoslav football player.

== Career ==
Born on March 1, 1913, in Belgrade, Kingdom of Serbia, he played most of his career as defender and occasionally as winger. He wore the red dress of SK Jugoslavija between 1935 and 1941.

He made one appearance for the Yugoslavia national team in a friendly match played in Belgrade on June 6, 1937, in a 1–1 draw against Belgium.

== Personal life ==
Later in his life he worked in the Serbian newspaper Politika. He died on December 6, 1985, in Sombor.
