= Alfons Pažur =

Croatian footballer (1896–1973)

Personal information
- Date of birth: 13 March 1896
- Place of birth: Zlatar, Austria-Hungary
- Date of death: 26 March 1973 (aged 77)
- Place of death: Zagreb, Yugoslavia

Senior career*
Years	Team	Apps	(Gls)
1925-1926	Concordia Zagreb		

International career
1925	Yugoslavia	1	(0)
- * Club domestic league appearances and goals

Alfons Pažur (13 March 1896 – 26 March 1973) was a Croatian footballer.

== International career ==
He played in one match for the Yugoslavia national football team, away against Italy in 1925.
