= Eugen Dasović =

Croatian footballer

Personal information
- Date of birth: 1 December 1896
- Place of birth: Slatina, Austria-Hungary
- Date of death: 7 February 1980 (aged 83)
- Place of death: Zagreb, Yugoslavia
- Position: Defender

Senior career*
Years	Team	Apps	(Gls)
1923–1924	HAŠK		
1924	DFC Prag		
1924-1926	Građanski	10	(3)
1926–1927	HAŠK		

International career
1923–1927	Kingdom of Yugoslavia	10	(0)
- * Club domestic league appearances and goals

Eugen Dasović (1 December 1896 – 7 February 1980) was a Croatian footballer. He competed in the men's tournament at the 1924 Summer Olympics.

== International career ==
He made his debut for Yugoslavia in a June 1923 friendly match away against Poland and earned a total of 10 caps, scoring no goals. His final international was an October 1927 friendly against Czechoslovakia.
