= Rudolf Dobrijević =

Croatian footballer (1906–1991)

Personal information
- Date of birth: 17 January 1906
- Place of birth: Pula, Austria-Hungary
- Date of death: 29 May 1991 (aged 85)
- Place of death: Rijeka, Yugoslavia
- Position: Midfielder

Senior career*
Years	Team	Apps	(Gls)
1923–1929	AS Gloria		
1929-1931	SK Jugoslavija		

International career
1930	Kingdom of Yugoslavia	1	(0)
- * Club domestic league appearances and goals

Rudolf Dobrijević (27 January 1906 – 29 May 1991) was a Croatian footballer.

== Club career ==
Born in Pula on 27 January 1906, back then part of Austro-Hungary, he was working as a chauffeur in the Spanish consulate in Fiume (Rijeka), and he started playing there for a local club AS Gloria while his brother played for Orijent. In 1929 he moved to Belgrade and joined SK Jugoslavija playing with them in the Yugoslav First League. He played mainly as right midfielder or winger. However, after two seasons he suffered a major injury and never more returned to professional football.

== International career ==
He played one match for the Yugoslavia national team. It was played against Bulgaria (2-2) on June 15, 1930, and it was the last match Yugoslavia played in their preparations for the 1930 FIFA World Cup.

== Personal life ==
He spent his last years of life in Rijeka and died on 29 May 1991.
