= Jovan Spasić =

Serbian footballer

Personal information
- Date of birth: 7 September 1909
- Place of birth: Leskovac, Kingdom of Serbia
- Date of death: 9 April 1981 (aged 71)
- Place of death: Rovinj, SFR Yugoslavia
- Position: Goalkeeper

Senior career*
Years	Team	Apps	(Gls)
1929–1938	SK Jugoslavija	69	(0)

International career
1931–1936	Yugoslavia	15	(0)

Managerial career
- Mačva Šabac
- * Club domestic league appearances and goals

Jovan Spasić (7 September 1909 – 9 April 1981) was a Yugoslav footballer who played as a goalkeeper.

Before playing football, he worked as a stonemason in Leskovac. From 1929, he played for SK Jugoslavija until 1938.

For the Yugoslavia national football team he made 15 appearances. He made his debut for Yugoslavia on 15 March 1931 against Greece (4–1) in Belgrade, and the played his last match on 12 July 1936 against Turkey (3–3) in Istanbul.

After World War II he worked as a coach at FK Mačva Šabac and for several clubs in Belgrade.
