= Marijan Marjanović =

Croatian footballer

Personal information
- Date of birth: 1904
- Date of death: 6 March 1983 (aged 78–79)

Senior career*
Years	Team	Apps	(Gls)
1924–1927	HAŠK		

International career
1924–1926	Kingdom of Serbs, Croats and Slovenes	6	(0)
- * Club domestic league appearances and goals

Marijan Marjanović (1904 – 6 March 1983) was a Croatian footballer. He competed in the men's tournament at the 1924 Summer Olympics.

== International career ==
Marjanović made his debut for Yugoslavia in a May 1924 Olympic Games match against Uruguay and earned a total of 6 caps, scoring no goals. His final international was an October 1926 King Alexander's Cup match against Romania.
