= Goran Miljanović =

Bosnian-Herzegovina Serb footballer

Personal information
- Date of birth: 2 October 1956
- Place of birth: Šibošnici, Yugoslavia
- Date of death: 25 March 2008 (aged 51)
- Place of death: Herentals, Belgium
- Position: Midfielder

Senior career*
Years	Team	Apps	(Gls)
- Jedinstvo Brčko
1978–1989	Sloboda Tuzla	224	(23)
1989–1990	Lierse SK	26	(2)
1991-1994	Herentals		

International career
1983–1988	Yugoslavia	4	(1)
- * Club domestic league appearances and goals

Goran Miljanović (2 October 1956 – 25 March 2008) was a Bosnian-Herzegovinian Serb football player who spent the majority of his career at Sloboda Tuzla.

== Club career ==
After leaving Sloboda, he played in Belgium for Lierse and third level Herentals, while working in one of their sponsor's stockings factory.

== International career ==
Miljanović made his debut for Yugoslavia in a March 1983 friendly match away against Romania and has earned a total of 4 caps, scoring 1 goal. His final international was a June 1988 friendly against West Germany.

== Personal life ==
After retiring as a player, he coached amateur side Netegalm. He was married to Dragica. He died in Herentals hospital in 2008 after a serious illness and was survived by Dragica and their sons Milan and Nenad.
