= Andrija Kujundžić =

Croatian footballer

Personal information
- Date of birth: 29 November 1899
- Place of birth: Szabadka, Kingdom of Hungary, Austria-Hungary
- Date of death: 11 October 1970 (aged 70)
- Place of death: Subotica, SR Serbia, SFR Yugoslavia

Senior career*
Years	Team	Apps	(Gls)
1921–1922	Bačka Subotica		

International career
1921-1922	Yugoslavia	2	(0)
- * Club domestic league appearances and goals

Andrija Kujundžić (29 November 1899 – 11 October 1970) was a Croatian footballer. He played in two matches for the Yugoslavia national football team in 1921 and 1922.
