= Andreja Kojić =

Serbian footballer (1896–1952)

Personal information
- Date of birth: 28 August 1896
- Place of birth: Belgrade, Kingdom of Serbia
- Date of death: 7 July 1952 (aged 55)
- Place of death: Belgrade, PR Serbia, FPR Yugoslavia
- Position: Forward

Youth career
- 1907–1911: Srpski mač

Senior career*
Years	Team	Apps	(Gls)
1911–1914	BSK		
- Marseille
- Aix-en-Provence
- Bordeaux
1918	Soko Pro Roma		
1918–1923	BSK		
1923–192x	Vojvodina		
- Sinđelić Niš
1931	Mačva Šabac	9	(0)
- Lešnica
–1937	Krupanj		

International career
1920	Kingdom of Serbs, Croats and Slovenes	1	(0)
- * Club domestic league appearances and goals

Andreja "Andrica" Kojić (Serbian Cyrillic: Андреја Којић; 28 August 1896 – 7 July 1952) was a Serbian footballer. He was part of the first generation of Serbian footballers and was a forward known for his technical skills, strong shot with both legs and extreme elegance in his playing style.

== Biography ==
Born in Belgrade, he started playing football in the youth team of SK Srpski mač which was one of the first football clubs in Belgrade. In 1911 he moved to the newly formed BSK Belgrade and became part of the first generation of players to represent the "Blues" which would dominate Serbian and Yugoslav football during the following decades. At the end of 1915, with World War I fully under way, he leaves Serbia and moves to France where he will play with Olympique de Marseille, Aix-en-Provence and Girondins de Bordeaux in the following years. In 1918 he moves to SK Soko Pro Roma which was a club formed by exiled footballers from Serbia in Rome, Italy. At the end of the war, he returned to Belgrade, now capital of the Kingdom of Serbs, Croats and Slovenes (kingdom later renamed to Yugoslavia in 1929) and plays with BSK until 1923. Later that year, as an employee of the National Bank, he was transferred to Novi Sad, and he continued his career by playing there with FK Vojvodina. Afterwards he also played with FK Sinđelić Niš and FK Mačva Šabac, and already with health problems, with Lešnica and FK Krupanj.

He played seven matches for the Belgrade Football Subassociation team, and he was part of the first Yugoslavia national team squad which was formed to play in the 1920 Summer Olympics.

He retired at the age of 41 playing with FK Krupanj. Domestic football analysts say that he played over 700 official matches throughout his career. He earned one cap, against Egypt in 1920.

=== Death ===
He died in Belgrade on July 7, 1952, and is buried in the Novo groblje cemetery in the capital.
