= Milutin Ivković =

Serbian footballer (1906–1943)

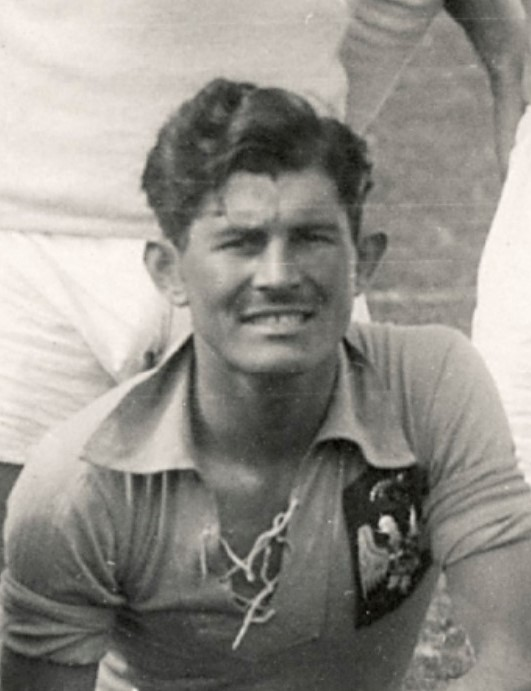
- Ivković in 1928

Personal information
- Full name: Milutin Ivković
- Date of birth: 3 March 1906
- Place of birth: Belgrade, Kingdom of Serbia
- Date of death: 25 May 1943 (aged 37)
- Place of death: Jajinci, Nazi-occupied Serbia
- Height: 1.88 m (6 ft 2 in)
- Position: Right-back

Senior career*
Years	Team	Apps	(Gls)
1922–1929	SK Jugoslavija	235	(13)
1929–1934	BASK	100	(14)
1934–1942	Župa Aleksandrovac	201	(4)
Total		536	(31)

International career
1925–1934	Yugoslavia	39	(0)
- * Club domestic league appearances and goals

Milutin Ivković (Serbian Cyrillic: Милутин Ивковић, pronounced [milǔtin ǐvkoʋitɕ]; 3 March 1906 – 25 May 1943) was a Yugoslav medical doctor and football defender who played for Yugoslavia at the 1928 Summer Olympics and the 1930 FIFA World Cup.

After his playing career, he became a communist political activist. He was killed by Nazi Germany during World War II on 25 May 1943 in Jajinci (near the capital city Belgrade).

== Early life ==
Ivković was born in Belgrade on 3 March 1906. His mother Milica was the granddaughter of the Serbian Vojvoda Radomir Putnik. It was during his childhood that he received his life-long nickname of Milutinac (pronounced [milutǐnats]).

== Playing career ==
=== Club career ===
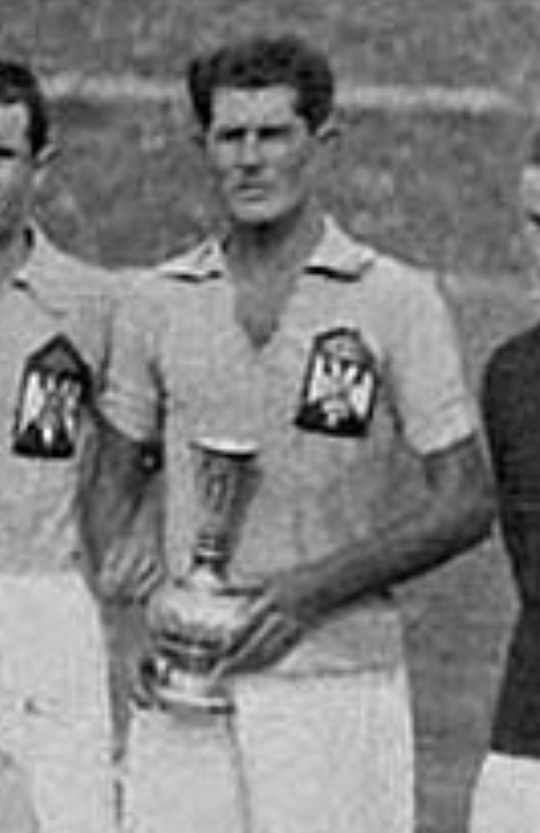
Ivković at the 1930 FIFA World Cup

He started playing football in the youth team of SK Jugoslavija, and became a regular senior player for the club between 1922 and 1929 playing a total of 235 matches. Towards the end of his career he moved to another Belgrade club, BASK.

=== International career ===
Ivković played for the Yugoslavia national team a total of 39 times. He made his debut on 28 October 1925 against Czechoslovakia (0-7 defeat) in Prague, and his last match for the national team was played on 16 December 1934 against France (2-3 defeat) in Paris. He participated in the first 1930 FIFA World Cup in Montevideo.

== Post-playing career ==
In 1934, he graduated from the University of Belgrade Faculty of Medicine and after completing his military service he opened office in Belgrade.

Ivković joined the Progressive Movement and was one of the leaders of the boycott of the Olympic Games in Berlin. In June 1938 he became the editor of Mladost, launched at the initiative of the Communist Youth League.

=== Death and legacy ===
During the occupation of Yugoslavia, he cooperated with the Yugoslav Partisans. He was persecuted and on several occasions arrested and prosecuted. On 24 May 1943, he was arrested and the next day at Jajinci he was shot and killed "for communist activities". His body was never found.

The Football Association of Serbia set up in 1951 a plaque in the JNA Stadium (Partizan Stadium) and a street next to the Red Star Stadium (former playground of SK Jugoslavija) bears his name. Additionally, a monument made by Vladimir Jokanović, was erected in the outskirts of the same stadium and was inaugurated on 16 May 2013.
