= 1966–67 NK Dinamo Zagreb season =

Dinamo Zagreb
1966–67 season
- President: Ivan Šibl
- Manager: Branko Zebec
- Stadium: Stadion Maksimir
- 1. Federal League: 2nd place
- Marshal Tito Cup: First round (R16)
- Inter-Cities Fairs Cup: Winners (1st title)
- Mitropa Cup: Quarter-finals
- Top goalscorer: League: Slaven Zambata (13); All: Slaven Zambata (19)

The 1966–67 season was Dinamo Zagreb's 21st season in the Yugoslav First League. It was the second season that the league was played in a 30-round format after it had been expanded from 15 to 16 clubs in the 1965–66 season.

Dinamo finished runners-up in the league, with two points behind champions FK Sarajevo. They were also knocked out in the 1967–68 Yugoslav Cup by the same team, losing 1–0 in the Round of 16. However, it proved to be the club's most successful season in history in terms of European competitions, as they won the 1966–67 Inter-Cities Fairs Cup, beating England's Leeds United in the two-legged final 2–0 on aggregate.

This was Dinamo's second final in the competition, having lost the 1963 final to Spanish side Valencia four years earlier. It was also the first and only European trophy won by a Yugoslav club until Red Star Belgrade's triumph in the 1990–91 European Cup 24 years later.

Slaven Zambata was the club's top league scorer with 13 goals in 23 matches, and goalkeeper Marijan Brnčić was the only player who appeared in all 30 league matches for the Blues. In addition, Zambata also scored 6 goals in the Inter-Cities Fairs Cup, which meant he shared second place in the competition's goalscoring table (along with Burnley's Andy Lochhead and Eintracht Frankfurt's Oskar Lotz) behind Flórián Albert of Ferencváros.

== Players ==
=== Squad ===
The following is the full list of players who appeared in league matches for Dinamo in the 1966–67 season. Although Marijan Čerček did not appear in any of the 1966–67 league matches, he did appear for Dinamo in the Inter-Cities Fairs Cup.

Note: Flags indicate national team as defined under FIFA eligibility rules; some limited exceptions apply. Players may hold more than one non-FIFA nationality.

No.	Pos.	Nation	Player
---	GK	(Socialist Federal Republic of Yugoslavia) YUG	Zlatko Škorić
---	DF	(Socialist Federal Republic of Yugoslavia) YUG	Marijan Brnčić
---	DF	(Socialist Federal Republic of Yugoslavia) YUG	Rudolf Cvek
---		(Socialist Federal Republic of Yugoslavia) YUG	Zlatko Mesić
---	DF	(Socialist Federal Republic of Yugoslavia) YUG	Mladen Ramljak
---		(Socialist Federal Republic of Yugoslavia) YUG	Hrvoje Jukić
---	MF	(Socialist Federal Republic of Yugoslavia) YUG	Filip Blašković
---		(Socialist Federal Republic of Yugoslavia) YUG	Mirko Braun
---	DF	(Socialist Federal Republic of Yugoslavia) YUG	Branko Gračanin
---		(Socialist Federal Republic of Yugoslavia) YUG	Petar Lončarić
---	MF	(Socialist Federal Republic of Yugoslavia) YUG	Marijan Čerček

No.	Pos.	Nation	Player
---	MF	(Socialist Federal Republic of Yugoslavia) YUG	Krasnodar Rora
---	FW	(Socialist Federal Republic of Yugoslavia) YUG	Slaven Zambata
---	FW	(Socialist Federal Republic of Yugoslavia) YUG	Josip Gucmirtl
---	MF	(Socialist Federal Republic of Yugoslavia) YUG	Stjepan Lamza
---	FW	(Socialist Federal Republic of Yugoslavia) YUG	Marijan Novak
---		(Socialist Federal Republic of Yugoslavia) YUG	Ivica Kiš
---	DF	(Socialist Federal Republic of Yugoslavia) YUG	Rudolf Belin
---	MF	(Socialist Federal Republic of Yugoslavia) YUG	Zdenko Kobeščak
---		(Socialist Federal Republic of Yugoslavia) YUG	Ivica Pavić
---	MF	(Socialist Federal Republic of Yugoslavia) YUG	Denijal Pirić

=== Statistics ===
The following table lists appearances and goals of all players who represented Dinamo in the 1966–67 season. Only league matches and goals are taken into account.

Pos.	Player	Apps ^{†}	Gls ^{†}
GK	Zlatko Škorić	30	0
	Marijan Brnčić	29	2
	Rudolf Cvek	23	1
	Zlatko Mesić	21	1
	Mladen Ramljak	21	0
	Hrvoje Jukić	19	5
	Filip Blašković	16	0
	Mirko Braun	15	0
	Branko Gračanin	13	0
	Petar Lončarić	4	0
	Krasnodar Rora	29	3
	Slaven Zambata	23	13
	Josip Gucmirtl	21	5
	Stjepan Lamza	20	2
	Marijan Novak	20	1
	Ivica Kiš	12	4
	Rudolf Belin	12	3
	Zdenko Kobeščak	9	1
	Ivica Pavić	3	0
	Denijal Pirić	3	0

== First League ==
=== Matches ===
Date	Opponents	Home / Away	Result (F – A)	Dinamo scorers
21 Aug 1966	OFK Belgrade	A	0 – 0	
28 Aug 1966	Vojvodina	H	0 – 2	
4 Sep 1966	Vardar	A	1 – 0	Kiš
11 Sep 1966	Velež	A	1 – 0	Zambata
25 Sep 1966	Čelik	H	2 – 2	Zambata (2)
2 Oct 1966	Sutjeska	A	5 – 0	Cvek, Zambata, Lamza, Brnčić, Jukić
9 Oct 1966	Željezničar	H	0 – 0	
16 Oct 1966	Partizan	A	0 – 0	
23 Oct 1966	Hajduk Split	H	1 – 1	Zambata
30 Oct 1966	Olimpija Ljubljana	A	1 – 2	Jukić
13 Nov 1966	NK Zagreb	H	3 – 1	Zambata, Rora, Jukić
20 Nov 1966	Radnički Niš	A	1 – 0	Gucmirtl
27 Nov 1966	Rijeka	H	3 – 1	Zambata (2), Rora
4 Dec 1966	Sarajevo	A	1 – 1	Gucmirtl
11 Dec 1966	Red Star	H	2 – 1	Kiš (2)
5 Mar 1967	OFK Belgrade	H	1 – 0	Gucmirtl
12 Mar 1967	Vojvodina	A	0 – 2	
19 Mar 1967	Vardar	H	2 – 0	Kiš, Rora
26 Mar 1967	Velež	H	1 – 1	Belin
2 Apr 1967	Čelik	A	0 – 0	
9 Apr 1967	Sutjeska	H	3 – 0	Gucmirtl, Jukić, Kobeščak
16 Apr 1967	Željezničar	A	1 – 2	Brnčić
7 May 1967	Partizan	H	3 – 1	Zambata, Belin, Jukić
21 May 1967	Hajduk Split	A	0 – 0	
28 May 1967	Olimpija Ljubljana	H	3 – 1	Zambata, Lamza, Gucmirtl
4 Jun 1967	NK Zagreb	A	3 – 0	Zambata, Novak, Brnčić
11 Jun 1967	Radnički Niš	H	1 – 0	Belin
18 Jun 1967	Rijeka	A	2 – 3	Zambata, own goal
25 Jun 1967	Sarajevo	H	0 – 0	
2 Jul 1967	Red Star	A	1 – 0	Zambata

=== Classification ===
Pos	Team	Pld	W	D	L	GF	GA	GD	Pts	Qualification or relegation
1	Sarajevo (C)	30	18	6	6	51	29	+22	42	Qualification for European Cup first round
2	Dinamo Zagreb	30	15	10	5	42	21	+21	40	Invitation for Inter-Cities Fairs Cup first round
3	Partizan	30	14	10	6	52	28	+24	38	Invitation for Inter-Cities Fairs Cup first round
4	Vojvodina	30	12	9	9	40	39	+1	33	Invitation for Inter-Cities Fairs Cup first round
5	Red Star Belgrade	30	12	8	10	53	46	+7	32	Invitation for Mitropa Cup

Source: rsssf.org
Rules for classification: 1) points; 2) goal difference; 3) number of goals scored.
(C) Champions

== Inter-Cities Fairs Cup ==
Date	Opponents	Home/ Away	Result F – A	Dinamo scorers
21 September 1966	(Czechoslovakia) Spartak Brno	A	0 – 2	
5 October 1966	(Czechoslovakia) Spartak Brno	H	2 – 0 (aet)	Zambata, Jukić
16 October 1966	(Scotland) Dunfermline Athletic	A	2 – 4	Gucmirtl, Zambata
2 November 1966	(Scotland) Dunfermline Athletic	H	2 – 0	Zambata (2)
19 February 1967	(Romania) Dinamo Piteşti	A	1 – 0	Zambata
1 March 1967	(Romania) Dinamo Piteşti	H	0 – 0	
29 March 1967	(Italy) Juventus	A	2 – 2	Jukić (2)
19 April 1967	(Italy) Juventus	H	3 – 0	Novak, Mesić, Belin
7 June 1967	(West Germany) Eintracht Frankfurt	A	0 – 3	
14 June 1967	(West Germany) Eintracht Frankfurt	H	4 – 0 (aet)	Zambata, Novak, Gucmirtl, Belin
30 August 1967	(England) Leeds United	H	2 – 0	Čerček, Rora
6 September 1967	(England) Leeds United	A	0 – 0	

== See also ==
- 1966–67 Yugoslav First League
- 1966–67 Inter-Cities Fairs Cup
