= 1968–69 Yugoslav Cup =

1969 Yugoslav Football Cup
22nd Marshal Tito Cup
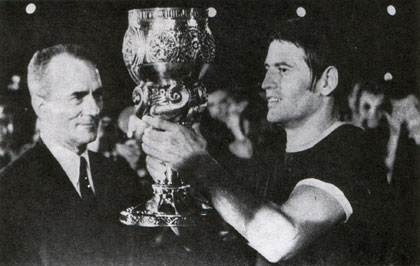

Tournament details
- Country: Yugoslavia
- Dates: 2 March – 19 June
- Teams: 16

Final positions
- Champions: Dinamo Zagreb (5th title)
- Runners-up: Hajduk Split
- Cup Winners' Cup: Dinamo Zagreb

Tournament statistics
- Matches played: 16
- Goals scored: 41 (2.56 per match)
- Goals scored in penalty shoot-outs not included.

The 1968–69 Yugoslav Cup was the 22nd season of the top football knockout competition in SFR Yugoslavia, the Yugoslav Cup (Serbo-Croatian: Kup Jugoslavije), also known as the "Marshal Tito Cup" (Kup Maršala Tita), since its establishment in 1946.

== Round of 16 ==
In the following tables winning teams are marked in bold; teams from outside top level are marked in italic script.

Tie no	Home team	Score	Away team
1	Borovo	0–2	**Red Star**
2	Budućnost Titograd	2–3 (a.e.t.)	**Partizan**
3	**Hajduk Split**	3–1	Sloboda Tuzla
4	**Napredak Kruševac**	2–0	Vardar
5	Radnički Niš	0–1	**Dinamo Zagreb**
6	**Rijeka**	1–0	Bor
7	Vojvodina	1–3	**Bačka (Bačka Palanka)**
8	**Željezničar Sarajevo**	1–0	Olimpija Ljubljana

== Quarter-finals ==
Tie no	Home team	Score	Away team
1	Bačka (Bačka Palanka)	1–2 (a.e.t.)	**Hajduk Split**
2	**Dinamo Zagreb**	1–0	Željezničar Sarajevo
3	**Partizan**	2–1	Rijeka
4	**Red Star**	4–0	Napredak Kruševac

== Semi-finals ==
Tie no	Home team	Score	Away team
1	**Hajduk Split**	1–0	Red Star
2	Partizan	0–0 (2–4 p)	**Dinamo Zagreb**

== Final ==
31 May 1969

Dinamo Zagreb	3 – 3 (a.e.t.)	Hajduk Split
Gucmirtl 23'; Zambata 71', 110'		Pavlica 16'; Bošković 74'; Vardić 100'

Stadion JNA, Belgrade
Attendance: 20,000
Referee: Milivoje Gugulović (Niš)

DINAMO ZAGREB:
GK	(Socialist Federal Republic of Yugoslavia) Fahrija Dautbegović
DF	(Socialist Federal Republic of Yugoslavia) Branko Gračanin
DF	(Socialist Federal Republic of Yugoslavia) Rudolf Cvek	Substituted off
DF	(Socialist Federal Republic of Yugoslavia) Rudolf Belin
DF	(Socialist Federal Republic of Yugoslavia) Mladen Ramljak
MF	(Socialist Federal Republic of Yugoslavia) Josip Gucmirtl
MF	(Socialist Federal Republic of Yugoslavia) Denijal Pirić
MF	(Socialist Federal Republic of Yugoslavia) Filip Blašković
MF	(Socialist Federal Republic of Yugoslavia) Krasnodar Rora
FW	(Socialist Federal Republic of Yugoslavia) Slaven Zambata
FW	(Socialist Federal Republic of Yugoslavia) Marijan Čerček	Substituted off
Substitutes:
DF	(Socialist Federal Republic of Yugoslavia) Marijan Brnčić	Substituted on
FW	(Socialist Federal Republic of Yugoslavia) Marijan Novak	Substituted on
Manager:
(Socialist Federal Republic of Yugoslavia) Ivica Horvat

HAJDUK SPLIT:
GK	(Socialist Federal Republic of Yugoslavia) Ante Sirković
DF	(Socialist Federal Republic of Yugoslavia) Dragan Holcer
DF	(Socialist Federal Republic of Yugoslavia) Vinko Cuzzi
DF	(Socialist Federal Republic of Yugoslavia) Ivan Buljan
DF	(Socialist Federal Republic of Yugoslavia) Miroslav Bošković
MF	(Socialist Federal Republic of Yugoslavia) Aleksandar Ristić
MF	(Socialist Federal Republic of Yugoslavia) Ivan Hlevnjak
MF	(Socialist Federal Republic of Yugoslavia) Miroslav Vardić
MF	(Socialist Federal Republic of Yugoslavia) Petar Nadoveza
FW	(Socialist Federal Republic of Yugoslavia) Džemaludin Mušović
FW	(Socialist Federal Republic of Yugoslavia) Ivan Pavlica	Substituted off
Substitutes:
FW	(Socialist Federal Republic of Yugoslavia) Mladen Matijanić	Substituted on
Manager:
(Socialist Federal Republic of Yugoslavia) Dušan Nenković

=== Replay ===
19 June 1969

Dinamo Zagreb	3–0	Hajduk Split
Belin 18'; Zambata 85'; Vabec 90'

Stadion JNA, Belgrade
Attendance: 15,000
Referee: Milivoje Gugulović (Niš)

DINAMO ZAGREB:
GK	**1**	(Socialist Federal Republic of Yugoslavia) Fahrija Dautbegović
DF	**2**	(Socialist Federal Republic of Yugoslavia) Rudolf Cvek
DF	**3**	(Socialist Federal Republic of Yugoslavia) Branko Gračanin
DF	**4**	(Socialist Federal Republic of Yugoslavia) Rudolf Belin
DF	**5**	(Socialist Federal Republic of Yugoslavia) Mladen Ramljak
MF	**6**	(Socialist Federal Republic of Yugoslavia) Filip Blašković
FW	**7**	(Socialist Federal Republic of Yugoslavia) Marijan Novak	Substituted off
MF	**8**	(Socialist Federal Republic of Yugoslavia) Denijal Pirić
FW	**9**	(Socialist Federal Republic of Yugoslavia) Slaven Zambata
MF	**10**	(Socialist Federal Republic of Yugoslavia) Josip Gucmirtl
MF	**11**	(Socialist Federal Republic of Yugoslavia) Krasnodar Rora	Substituted off
Substitutes:
FW	?	(Socialist Federal Republic of Yugoslavia) Drago Vabec	Substituted on
FW	?	(Socialist Federal Republic of Yugoslavia) Marijan Čerček	Substituted on
Manager:
(Socialist Federal Republic of Yugoslavia) Ivica Horvat

HAJDUK SPLIT:
GK	**1**	(Socialist Federal Republic of Yugoslavia) Radomir Vukčević
DF	**2**	(Socialist Federal Republic of Yugoslavia) Vinko Cuzzi	Substituted off
MF	**3**	(Socialist Federal Republic of Yugoslavia) Aleksandar Ristić
DF	**4**	(Socialist Federal Republic of Yugoslavia) Ivan Buljan	Substituted off
DF	**5**	(Socialist Federal Republic of Yugoslavia) Dragan Holcer
FW	**6**	(Socialist Federal Republic of Yugoslavia) Miroslav Ferić
MF	**7**	(Socialist Federal Republic of Yugoslavia) Miroslav Vardić
MF	**8**	(Socialist Federal Republic of Yugoslavia) Ivan Hlevnjak
FW	**9**	(Socialist Federal Republic of Yugoslavia) Džemaludin Mušović
DF	**10**	(Socialist Federal Republic of Yugoslavia) Miroslav Bošković
FW	**11**	(Socialist Federal Republic of Yugoslavia) Ivan Pavlica
Substitutes:
DF	?	(Socialist Federal Republic of Yugoslavia) Petar Bonačić	Substituted on
MF	?	(Socialist Federal Republic of Yugoslavia) Petar Nadoveza	Substituted on
Manager:
(Socialist Federal Republic of Yugoslavia) Dušan Nenković

== See also ==
- 1968–69 Yugoslav First League
- 1968–69 Yugoslav Second League
