= 1965–66 Yugoslav Cup =

1966 Yugoslav Football Cup
19th Marshal Tito Cup
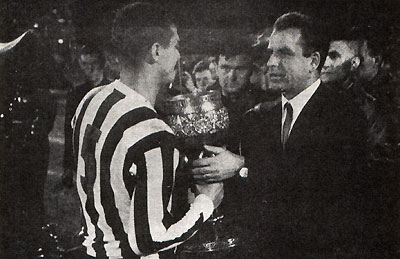
- Josip Skolbar during one of the matches

Tournament details
- Country: Yugoslavia
- Dates: 27 February – 26 May
- Teams: 16

Final positions
- Champions: OFK Beograd (4th title)
- Runners-up: Dinamo Zagreb
- Cup Winners' Cup: OFK Beograd

Tournament statistics
- Matches played: 15
- Goals scored: 52 (3.47 per match)
- Goals scored in penalty shoot-outs not included.

The 1965–66 Yugoslav Cup was the 19th season of the top football knockout competition in SFR Yugoslavia, the Yugoslav Cup (Serbo-Croatian: Kup Jugoslavije), also known as the "Marshal Tito's Cup" (Kup Maršala Tita), since its establishment in 1946.

== First round proper ==
In the following tables winning teams are marked in bold; teams from outside top level are indicated with Roman numerals, corresponding to league level.

| Tie no | Home team | Score | Away team |
|---|---|---|---|
| 1 | Aluminij Kidričevo (III) | 0–4 | Slavonija Osijek (II) |
| 2 | Bačka (BP) (II) | 2–3 | **Vardar** |
| 3 | Hajduk Split | 0–0 (3–4 p) | **Dinamo Zagreb** |
| 4 | **Rijeka** | 3–1 | Partizan |
| 5 | Sloboda Tuzla (II) | 5–0 | Mladost (SP) (III) |
| 6 | Sutjeska Nikšić (II) | 3–3 (5–7 p) | **OFK Beograd** |
| 7 | Trepça (II) | 3–1 | Red Star |
| 8 | Željezničar | 0–1 | Srem (II) |

== Quarter-finals ==
| Tie no | Home team | Score | Away team |
|---|---|---|---|
| 1 | **Dinamo Zagreb** | 1–0 | Trepça (II) |
| 2 | Slavonija Osijek (II) | 2–1 | Rijeka |
| 3 | Srem (II) | 1–2 | **OFK Beograd** |
| 4 | Vardar | 0–0 (3–4 p) | Sloboda Tuzla (II) |

== Semi-finals ==
| Tie no | Home team | Score | Away team |
|---|---|---|---|
| 1 | **OFK Beograd** | 2–0 | Sloboda Tuzla (II) |
| 2 | Slavonija Osijek (II) | 1–5 | **Dinamo Zagreb** |

== Final ==
26 May 1966

| OFK Beograd | 6–2 | Dinamo Zagreb |
|---|---|---|
| Skoblar 10', 43'; Santrač 17', 36'; Samardžić 63', 85' | Report | Kiš 29'; Lamza 87' |

Stadion JNA, Belgrade
Attendance: 35,000
Referee: A. Šestić (Mostar)

OFK BELGRADE:
| GK | 1 | (Socialist Federal Republic of Yugoslavia) Bratislav Đorđević |
| DF | 2 | (Socialist Federal Republic of Yugoslavia) Miroslav Milovanović |
| DF | 3 | (Socialist Federal Republic of Yugoslavia) Todor Grujić |
| DF | 4 | (Socialist Federal Republic of Yugoslavia) Stojan Vukašinović |
| DF | 5 | (Socialist Federal Republic of Yugoslavia) Blagomir Krivokuća |
| MF | 6 | (Socialist Federal Republic of Yugoslavia) Dragan Gugleta |
| MF | 7 | (Socialist Federal Republic of Yugoslavia) Spasoje Samardžić |
| MF | 8 | (Socialist Federal Republic of Yugoslavia) Zoran Dakić |
| FW | 9 | (Socialist Federal Republic of Yugoslavia) Slobodan Santrač |
| FW | 10 | (Socialist Federal Republic of Yugoslavia) Josip Skoblar |
| FW | 11 | (Socialist Federal Republic of Yugoslavia) Sreten Banović |
Manager:
(Socialist Federal Republic of Yugoslavia) Dragiša Milić

DINAMO ZAGREB:
| GK | 1 | (Socialist Federal Republic of Yugoslavia) Zlatko Škorić |
| DF | 2 | (Socialist Federal Republic of Yugoslavia) Rudolf Cvek |
| DF | 3 | (Socialist Federal Republic of Yugoslavia) Petar Lončarić |
| DF | 4 | (Socialist Federal Republic of Yugoslavia) Branko Gračanin |
| DF | 5 | (Socialist Federal Republic of Yugoslavia) Mladen Ramljak |
| MF | 6 | (Socialist Federal Republic of Yugoslavia) Miljenko Puljčan |
| MF | 7 | (Socialist Federal Republic of Yugoslavia) Ivica Pavić |
| MF | 8 | (Socialist Federal Republic of Yugoslavia) Josip Gucmirtl |
| FW | 9 | (Socialist Federal Republic of Yugoslavia) Slaven Zambata |
| FW | 10 | (Socialist Federal Republic of Yugoslavia) Ivica Kiš |
| FW | 11 | (Socialist Federal Republic of Yugoslavia) Stjepan Lamza |
Manager:
(Socialist Federal Republic of Yugoslavia) Branko Zebec

== See also ==
- 1965–66 Yugoslav First League
- 1965–66 Yugoslav Second League
