= 1967 Inter-Cities Fairs Cup final =

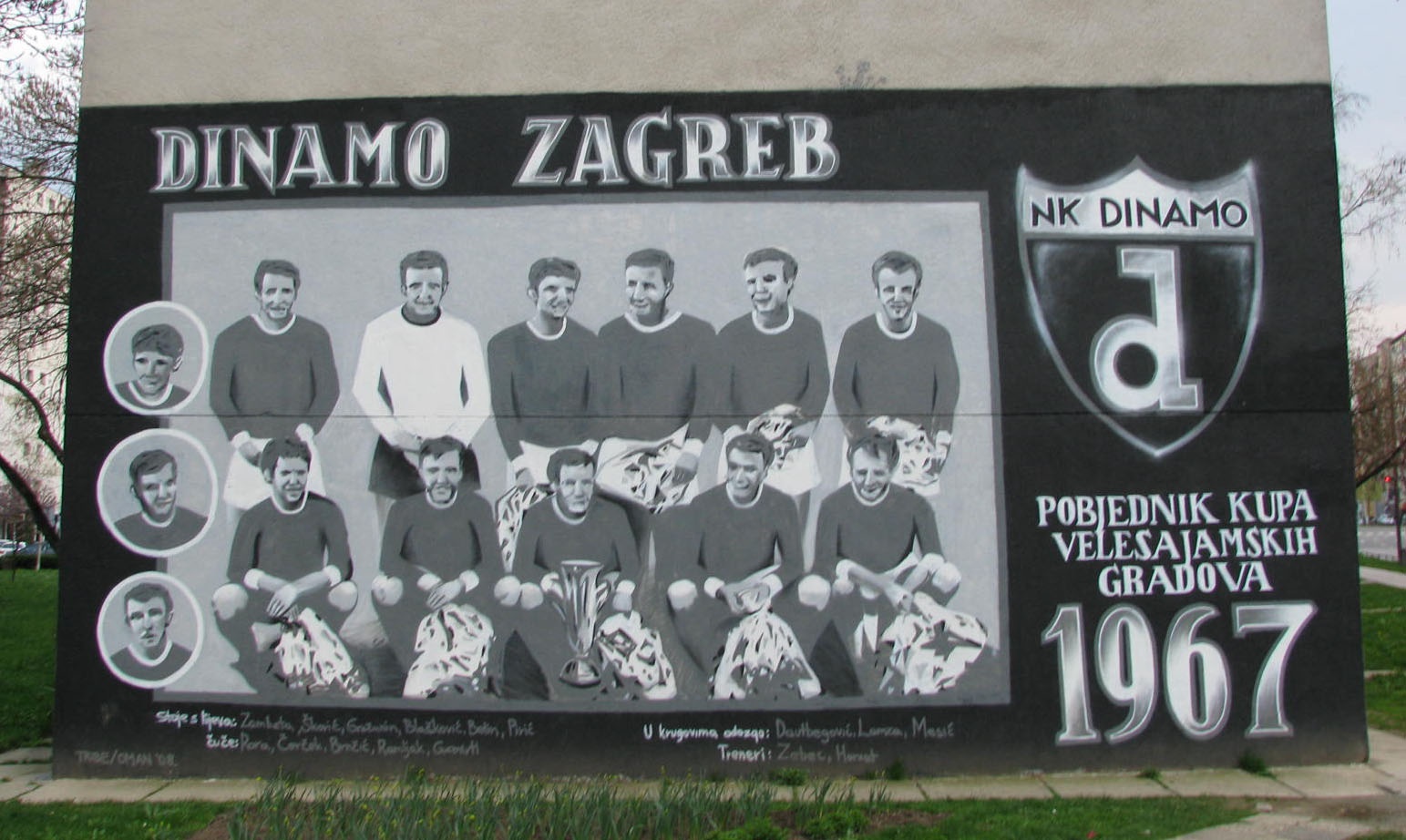
- Graffiti in Zagreb commemorating the title
- Event: 1966–67 Inter-Cities Fairs Cup
Dinamo Zagreb	Leeds United
(Socialist Federal Republic of Yugoslavia)	(England)
2	0
- on aggregate

First leg
Dinamo Zagreb	Leeds United
2	0
- Date: 30 August 1967
- Venue: Maksimir Stadium, Zagreb
- Referee: Adolfo Bueno Perales (Spain)
- Attendance: 32,000

Second leg
Leeds United	Dinamo Zagreb
0	0
- Date: 6 September 1967
- Venue: Elland Road, Leeds
- Referee: Antonio Sbardella (Italy)
- Attendance: 35,604

The 1967 Inter-Cities Fairs Cup final was the final of the ninth edition of the Inter-Cities Fairs Cup. It was played on 30 August and 6 September 1967 between Dinamo Zagreb of Yugoslavia and Leeds United of England. Dinamo Zagreb won the tie 2–0 on aggregate, following a 2–0 victory in Zagreb and a 0–0 draw in Leeds.

== Route to the final ==
Dinamo Zagreb				Round	Leeds United			
Opponent	Agg.	1st leg	2nd leg		Opponent	Agg.	1st leg	2nd leg
(Czechoslovakia) Spartak Brno	2–2 (c)	0–2 (A)	2–0 (a.e.t.) (H)	First round	Bye			
(Scotland) Dunfermline Athletic	4–4 (a)	2–4 (A)	2–0 (H)	Second round	(Netherlands) DWS	8–2	3–1 (A)	5–1 (H)
(Romania) Dinamo Pitești	1–0	1–0 (A)	0–0 (H)	Third round	(Spain) Valencia	3–1	1–1 (H)	2–0 (A)
(Italy) Juventus	5–2	2–2 (A)	3–0 (H)	Quarter-finals	(Italy) Bologna	1–1 (c)	0–1 (A)	1–0 (a.e.t.) (H)
(West Germany) Eintracht Frankfurt	4–3	0–3 (A)	4–0 (a.e.t.) (H)	Semi-finals	(Scotland) Kilmarnock	4–2	4–2 (H)	0–0 (A)

== Match details ==
=== First leg ===
30 August 1967

Dinamo Zagreb (Socialist Federal Republic of Yugoslavia)	2–0	(England) Leeds United
Čerček 39'; Rora 59'

Maksimir, Zagreb
Attendance: 32,000
Referee: Adolfo Bueno Perales (Spain)

Dinamo Zagreb
Leeds United

GK	1	(Socialist Federal Republic of Yugoslavia) Zlatko Škorić
DF	2	(Socialist Federal Republic of Yugoslavia) Branko Gračanin
DF	3	(Socialist Federal Republic of Yugoslavia) Marijan Brnčić
MF	4	(Socialist Federal Republic of Yugoslavia) Rudolf Belin
DF	5	(Socialist Federal Republic of Yugoslavia) Mladen Ramljak
MF	6	(Socialist Federal Republic of Yugoslavia) Filip Blašković
MF	7	(Socialist Federal Republic of Yugoslavia) Marijan Čerček
MF	8	(Socialist Federal Republic of Yugoslavia) Denijal Pirić
FW	9	(Socialist Federal Republic of Yugoslavia) Slaven Zambata (c)
FW	10	(Socialist Federal Republic of Yugoslavia) Josip Gucmirtl
MF	11	(Socialist Federal Republic of Yugoslavia) Krasnodar Rora
Manager:
(Socialist Federal Republic of Yugoslavia) Ivica Horvat

GK	1	(Wales) Gary Sprake
DF	2	(England) Paul Reaney
DF	3	(England) Terry Cooper
MF	4	(Scotland) Billy Bremner (c)
DF	5	(England) Jack Charlton
DF	6	(England) Norman Hunter
MF	7	(England) Mick Bates
MF	8	(Scotland) Peter Lorimer
FW	9	(England) Rod Belfitt
FW	10	(Scotland) Eddie Gray
FW	11	(England) Michael O'Grady
Manager:
(England) Don Revie

=== Second leg ===
6 September 1967

Leeds United (England)	0–0	(Socialist Federal Republic of Yugoslavia) Dinamo Zagreb

Elland Road, Leeds
Attendance: 35,604
Referee: Antonio Sbardella (Italy)

Leeds United
Dinamo Zagreb

GK	1	(Wales) Gary Sprake
DF	2	(Scotland) Willie Bell
DF	3	(England) Terry Cooper
MF	4	(Scotland) Billy Bremner (c)
DF	5	(England) Jack Charlton
DF	6	(England) Norman Hunter
MF	7	(England) Paul Reaney
MF	8	(England) Rod Belfitt
FW	9	(England) Jimmy Greenhoff
FW	10	(Republic of Ireland) Johnny Giles
FW	11	(England) Michael O'Grady
Manager:
(England) Don Revie

GK	1	(Socialist Federal Republic of Yugoslavia) Zlatko Škorić
DF	2	(Socialist Federal Republic of Yugoslavia) Branko Gračanin
DF	3	(Socialist Federal Republic of Yugoslavia) Marijan Brnčić
DF	4	(Socialist Federal Republic of Yugoslavia) Rudolf Belin
DF	5	(Socialist Federal Republic of Yugoslavia) Mladen Ramljak
MF	6	(Socialist Federal Republic of Yugoslavia) Filip Blašković
MF	7	(Socialist Federal Republic of Yugoslavia) Marijan Čerček
MF	8	(Socialist Federal Republic of Yugoslavia) Denijal Pirić
FW	9	(Socialist Federal Republic of Yugoslavia) Slaven Zambata (c)
FW	10	(Socialist Federal Republic of Yugoslavia) Josip Gucmirtl
FW	11	(Socialist Federal Republic of Yugoslavia) Krasnodar Rora
Manager:
(Socialist Federal Republic of Yugoslavia) Ivica Horvat

Dinamo Zagreb win 2–0 on aggregate

== See also ==
- GNK Dinamo Zagreb in European football
- 1966–67 Inter-Cities Fairs Cup
- Leeds United F.C. in European football
