= GNK Dinamo Zagreb in European football =

Croatian club in European football

GNK Dinamo Zagreb in international football
- Club: GNK Dinamo Zagreb
- Seasons played: 55
- First entry: 1958–59 European Cup
- Latest entry: 2026–27 UEFA Europa League

Titles
- Champions League: GS/LP: 1998–99; 1999–2000; 2011–12; 2012–13; 2015–16; 2016–17; 2019–20; 2022–23; 2024–25
- Europa League: QF: 2020–21
- Cup Winners' Cup: SF: 1960–61
- Conference League: R16: 2023–24
- Inter-Cities Fairs Cup: W: 1966–67

This article lists results for GNK Dinamo Zagreb in European competition.

After winning the first post-war Zagreb municipal championship held in January and February 1946 and finishing runners-up in the Croatian regional championship (behind Hajduk Split), they qualified for the nationwide 1946–47 Yugoslav First League. The club spent their entire existence playing top-flight football, and they soon established themselves as one of the Yugoslav Big Four (along with Hajduk Split, Partizan and Red Star Belgrade), finishing runners-up in the inaugural season of the national championship, and then winning Yugoslav titles in 1948, 1954 and 1958.

They were the third Yugoslav club to play in an UEFA-sponsored competition (after Partizan in 1955 and Red Star in 1956) and their first European Cup tie was against Czechoslovak side Dukla Prague in 1958. In the 1960s Dinamo experienced their most successful period in both domestic and European football which saw them win four Yugoslav Cups but failing to clinch a single championship title, finishing runners-up five times between 1960 and 1969. On the European stage, the club had two successful campaigns in the Inter-Cities Fairs Cup, reaching the finals on two occasions. In the 1963 final Dinamo lost to Valencia, but in 1967 they beat England's Leeds United. This was the only European silverware won by a Yugoslav club until Red Star Belgrade won the 1990–91 European Cup 24 years later.

== Dinamo in Europe ==
- Dinamo played their first European match on 10 September 1958 against Dukla Prague. The match ended in a 2–2 draw, with Luka Lipošinović netting a brace and Jaroslav Borovička and Jan Brumovský scoring for the Czech side. The second leg was played on 1 October, with Franjo Gašpert scoring in a 1–2 loss and a 3–4 aggregate defeat.
- Biggest defeat was against Barcelona in the away game of the second round of ICFC. The game was played on 13 December 1961 and ended in a 5–1 trashing, with Evaristo de Macedo scoring a hat-trick. Other scorers for Barcelona were Sándor Kocsis and Chus Pereda, while Dražan Jerković claimed a consolation goal in the 87th minute. The second leg in Zagreb ended in a 2–2 draw, with two goals from Stjepan Lamza and another goal from Evaristo de Macedo and Pedro Zaballa to make it 7–3 on aggregate for the Catalan club.
- In the 1962–63 season Dinamo enjoyed a successful campaign in the ICFC. Dinamo beat Porto 2–1 with goals from Borislav Ribic and Ilijas Pašić.
- In the 1982–83 season Dinamo was knocked out in the first round, this time by Sporting CP. Dinamo won the first leg at Maksimir by a single goal from Snješko Cerin, but then lost the away leg 3–0 with a hat-trick from Sporting's António Oliveira.
- In the 1988–89 season Dinamo was knocked out in the second round of the UEFA cup by VfB Stuttgart, coached by Arie Haan and featuring Jurgen Klinsmann and Srečko Katanec. Stuttgart later reached the finals of the competition, only to be beaten by Diego Maradona's Napoli. In the 2019–20 season Dinamo finished on the last position in the Champions League group with Shakhtar, Manchester City and Atalanta.

== Summary ==
=== By competition ===
Note: This summary includes matches played in the Inter-Cities Fairs Cup, which was not endorsed by UEFA and is not counted in UEFA's official European statistics.
Defunct competitions are listed in italics.
Pld = Matches played; W = Matches won; D = Matches drawn; L = Matches lost; GF = Goals for; GA = Goals against; GD = Goal difference

Competition	Pld	W	D	L	GF	GA	GD	Win%	Last season played
UEFA Champions League European Cup	176	75	37	64	272	244	+28	42.61%	2026–27
UEFA Europa League UEFA Cup	149	59	33	57	212	188	+24	39.60%	2026–27
UEFA Europa Conference League	10	5	1	4	15	11	+4	50.00%	2023–24
UEFA Cup Winners' Cup	31	11	6	14	31	38	−7	35.48%	1994–95
Inter-Cities Fairs Cup	39	16	10	13	65	47	+18	41.02%	1970–71
Total	405	166	87	152	600	527	+73	40.99%	–

Last updated on 26 August 2026 after match Viking - Dinamo Zagreb 3:1 Source: UEFA.com

=== By ground ===
Overall	Pld	W	D	L	GF	GA	GD	Win%
Home^{1}	200	101	46	53	368	224	+144	50.50%
Away^{2}	203	64	41	98	229	307	−78	31.53%
Total	403	165	87	151	597	531	+66	40.94%

Last updated on 26 August 2026 after match Viking - Dinamo Zagreb 3:1 Source: UEFA.com

^{1} Includes two matches where Dinamo played as hosts away from their home stadium (the 1991–92 UEFA Cup fixture against Trabzonspor, played in Klagenfurt, Austria on 17 September 1991, and the 1993–94 Champions League first round fixture against Steaua Bucharest, played in Ljubljana, Slovenia on 28 September 1993).

^{2} Includes two playoff matches before the introduction of penalties and the away goals rule in two-legged fixtures (the 1962–63 Inter-Cities Fairs Cup fixture against Union Saint-Gilloise, played in Linz, Austria, on 13 February 1963, and the 1963–64 Cup Winners' Cup fixture against Linzer ASK, also played in Linz, Austria, on 23 October 1963).

== Best results in international competitions ==
Season	Achievement	Notes
UEFA Champions League
1998–99	Group stage	2nd in the group behind (Greece) Olympiacos, ahead of (Portugal) Porto and (Netherlands) Ajax
UEFA Europa League
2020–21	Quarter-finals	lost to (Spain) Villarreal 0–1 in Zagreb, 1–2 in Villarreal
UEFA Cup Winners' Cup
1960–61	Semi-finals	lost to (Italy) Fiorentina 2–1 in Zagreb, 0–3 in Florence
Inter-Cities Fairs Cup
1966–67	Winners	defeated (England) Leeds United 2–0 in Zagreb, 0–0 in Leeds
UEFA Conference League
2023–24	Round of 16	lost to (Greece) PAOK 2–0 in Zagreb, 1–5 in Thessaloniki

== List of matches ==
Note: Dinamo score always listed first.

Season	Competition	Round	Opponent	Home	Away	Agg.
1958–59	European Cup	QR	(Czechoslovakia) Dukla Prague	2–2	1–2	3–4
1960–61	Cup Winners' Cup	QF	(Czechoslovakia) RH Brno	2–0	0–0	2–0
1960–61	Cup Winners' Cup	SF	(Italy) Fiorentina	2–1	0–3	2–4
1961–62	Inter-Cities Fairs Cup	R1	(Denmark) Stævnet	2–2	7–2	9–4
1961–62	Inter-Cities Fairs Cup	R2	(Spain) Barcelona	2–2	1–5	3–7
1962–63	Inter-Cities Fairs Cup	R1	(Portugal) Porto	0–0	2–1	2–1
1962–63	Inter-Cities Fairs Cup	R2	(Belgium) Union Saint-Gilloise	2–1	0–1	2–2 (po 3–2)
1962–63	Inter-Cities Fairs Cup	QF	(West Germany) Bayern Munich	0–0	4–1	4–1
1962–63	Inter-Cities Fairs Cup	SF	(Hungary) Ferencváros	2–1	1–0	3–1
1962–63	Inter-Cities Fairs Cup	Final	(Spain) Valencia	1–2	0–2	1–4
1963–64	Cup Winners' Cup	QR	(Austria) LASK	1–0	0–1	1–1 (po 1–1)
1963–64	Cup Winners' Cup	R1	(Scotland) Celtic	2–1	0–3	2–4
1964–65	Cup Winners' Cup	R1	(Greece) AEK Athens	3–0	0–2	3–2
1964–65	Cup Winners' Cup	R2	(Romania) Steaua București	2–0	3–1	5–1
1964–65	Cup Winners' Cup	QF	(Italy) Torino	1–2	1–1	2–3
1965–66	Cup Winners' Cup	R1	(Spain) Atlético Madrid	0–1	0–4	0–5
1966–67	Inter-Cities Fairs Cup	R1	(Czechoslovakia) Spartak Brno	2–0	0–2	2–2 (c)
1966–67	Inter-Cities Fairs Cup	R2	(Scotland) Dunfermline Athletic	2–0	2–4	4–4 (a)
1966–67	Inter-Cities Fairs Cup	R3	(Romania) Dinamo Pitești	0–0	1–0	1–0
1966–67	Inter-Cities Fairs Cup	QF	(Italy) Juventus	3–0	2–2	5–2
1966–67	Inter-Cities Fairs Cup	SF	(West Germany) Eintracht Frankfurt	4–0 (a.e.t.)	0–3	4–3
1966–67	Inter-Cities Fairs Cup	Final	(England) Leeds United	2–0	0–0	2–0
1967–68	Inter-Cities Fairs Cup	R1	(Romania) Petrolul Ploiești	5–0	0–2	5–2
1967–68	Inter-Cities Fairs Cup	R2	(Italy) Bologna	1–2	0–0	1–2
1968–69	Inter-Cities Fairs Cup	R1	(Italy) Fiorentina	1–1	1–2	2–3
1969–70	Cup Winners' Cup	R1	(Czechoslovakia) Slovan Bratislava	3–0	0–0	3–0
1969–70	Cup Winners' Cup	R2	(France) Marseille	2–0	1–1	3–1
1969–70	Cup Winners' Cup	QF	(West Germany) Schalke 04	1–3	0–1	1–4
1970–71	Inter-Cities Fairs Cup	R1	(Portugal) Barreirense	6–1	0–2	6–3
1970–71	Inter-Cities Fairs Cup	R2	(West Germany) Hamburger SV	4–0	0–1	4–1
1970–71	Inter-Cities Fairs Cup	R3	(Netherlands) Twente	2–2	0–1	2–3
1971–72	UEFA Cup	R1	(Bulgaria) Botev Vratsa	6–1	2–1	8–2
1971–72	UEFA Cup	R2	(Austria) Rapid Vienna	2–2	0–0	2–2 (a)
1973–74	Cup Winners' Cup	R1	(Italy) Milan	1–3	0–1	1–4
1976–77	UEFA Cup	R1	(Romania) ASA Târgu Mureș	3–0	1–0	4–0
1976–77	UEFA Cup	R2	(East Germany) 1. FC Magdeburg	2–2	0–2	2–4
1977–78	UEFA Cup	R1	(Greece) Olympiacos	5–1	1–3	6–4
1977–78	UEFA Cup	R2	(Italy) Torino	1–0	1–3	2–3
1979–80	UEFA Cup	R1	(Italy) Perugia	0–0	0–1	0–1
1980–81	Cup Winners' Cup	R1	(Portugal) Benfica	0–0	0–2	0–2
1982–83	European Cup	R1	(Portugal) Sporting CP	1–0	0–3	1–3
1983–84	Cup Winners' Cup	R1	(Portugal) Porto	2–1	0–1	2–2 (a)
1988–89	UEFA Cup	R1	(Turkey) Beşiktaş	2–0	0–1	2–1
1988–89	UEFA Cup	R2	(West Germany) VfB Stuttgart	1–3	1–1	2–4
1989–90	UEFA Cup	QR	(France) Auxerre	1–3	1–0	2–3
1990–91	UEFA Cup	R1	(Italy) Atalanta	1–1	0–0	1–1 (a)
1991–92	UEFA Cup	R1	(Turkey) Trabzonspor	2–3	1–1	3–4
1993–94	Champions League	PR	(Faroe Islands) B68 Toftir	6–0	5–0	11–0
1993–94	Champions League	R1	(Romania) Steaua București	2–3	2–1	4–4 (a)
1994–95	Cup Winners' Cup	R1	(France) Auxerre	3–1	0–3	3–4
1996–97	UEFA Cup	PR	(Albania) KF Tirana	4–0	6–2	10–2
1996–97	UEFA Cup	QR	(Russia) Spartak Moscow	3–1	0–2	3–3 (a)
1997–98	Champions League	QR1	(Federal Republic of Yugoslavia) Partizan	5–0	0–1	5–1
1997–98	Champions League	QR2	(England) Newcastle United	2–2 (a.e.t.)	1–2	3–4
1997–98	UEFA Cup	R1	(Switzerland) Grasshoppers	4–4	5–0	9–4
1997–98	UEFA Cup	R2	(Hungary) MTK Budapest	2–0	0–1	2–1
1997–98	UEFA Cup	R3	(Spain) Atlético Madrid	1–1	0–1	1–2
1998–99	Champions League	QR2	(Scotland) Celtic	3–0	0–1	3–1
1998–99	Champions League	GS	(Netherlands) Ajax	0–0	1–0	2nd out of 4
1998–99	Champions League	GS	(Greece) Olympiacos	1–1	0–2	2nd out of 4
1998–99	Champions League	GS	(Portugal) Porto	3–1	0–3	2nd out of 4
1999–2000	Champions League	QR3	(Hungary) MTK Budapest	0–0	2–0	2–0
1999–2000	Champions League	GS	(England) Manchester United	1–2	0–0	4th out of 4
1999–2000	Champions League	GS	(France) Marseille	1–2	2–2	4th out of 4
1999–2000	Champions League	GS	(Austria) Sturm Graz	3–0	0–1	4th out of 4
2000–01	Champions League	QR3	(Italy) Milan	0–3	1–3	1–6
2000–01	UEFA Cup	R1	(Slovakia) Slovan Bratislava	1–1	3–0	4–1
2000–01	UEFA Cup	R2	(Italy) Parma	1–0	0–2	1–2
2001–02	UEFA Cup	QR	(Estonia) Flora Tallinn	1–0	1–0	2–0
2001–02	UEFA Cup	R1	(Israel) Maccabi Tel Aviv	2–2	1–1	3–3 (a)
2002–03	UEFA Cup	R1	(Hungary) Zalaegerszeg	6–0	3–1	9–1
2002–03	UEFA Cup	R2	(England) Fulham	0–3	1–2	1–5
2003–04	Champions League	QR2	(Slovenia) Maribor	2–1	1–1	3–2
2003–04	Champions League	QR3	(Ukraine) Dynamo Kyiv	0–2	1–3	1–5
2003–04	UEFA Cup	R1	(Hungary) MTK Budapest	3–1	0–0	3–1
2003–04	UEFA Cup	R2	(Ukraine) Dnipro Dnipropetrovsk	0–2	1–1	1–3
2004–05	UEFA Cup	QR2	(Slovenia) Primorje	4–0	0–2	4–2
2004–05	UEFA Cup	R1	(Sweden) Elfsborg	2–0	0–0	2–0
2004–05	UEFA Cup	GS	(Belgium) Beveren	6–1		4th out of 5
2004–05	UEFA Cup	GS	(Portugal) Benfica		0–2	4th out of 5
2004–05	UEFA Cup	GS	(Netherlands) Heerenveen	2–2		4th out of 5
2004–05	UEFA Cup	GS	(Germany) VfB Stuttgart		1–2	4th out of 5
2006–07	Champions League	QR2	(Lithuania) Ekranas	5–2	4–1	9–3
2006–07	Champions League	QR3	(England) Arsenal	0–3	1–2	1–5
2006–07	UEFA Cup	R1	(France) Auxerre	1–2	1–3	2–5
2007–08	Champions League	QR1	(Azerbaijan) Khazar Lankaran	3–1	1–1	4–2
2007–08	Champions League	QR2	(Slovenia) Domžale	3–1	2–1	5–2
2007–08	Champions League	QR3	(Germany) Werder Bremen	2–3	1–2	3–5
2007–08	UEFA Cup	R1	(Netherlands) Ajax	0–1	3–2	3–3 (a)
2007–08	UEFA Cup	GS	(Switzerland) Basel	0–0		4th out of 5
2007–08	UEFA Cup	GS	(Norway) Brann		1–2	4th out of 5
2007–08	UEFA Cup	GS	(Germany) Hamburger SV	0–2		4th out of 5
2007–08	UEFA Cup	GS	(France) Rennes		1–1	4th out of 5
2008–09	Champions League	QR1	(Northern Ireland) Linfield	1–1	2–0	3–1
2008–09	Champions League	QR2	(Slovenia) Domžale	3–2	3–0	6–2
2008–09	Champions League	QR3	(Ukraine) Shakhtar Donetsk	1–3	0–2	1–5
2008–09	UEFA Cup	R1	(Czech Republic) Sparta Prague	0–0	3–3	3–3 (a)
2008–09	UEFA Cup	GS	(Netherlands) NEC	3–2		5th out of 5
2008–09	UEFA Cup	GS	(England) Tottenham Hotspur		0–4	5th out of 5
2008–09	UEFA Cup	GS	(Russia) Spartak Moscow	0–1		5th out of 5
2008–09	UEFA Cup	GS	(Italy) Udinese		1–2	5th out of 5
2009–10	Champions League	QR2	(Armenia) Pyunik	3–0	0–0	3–0
2009–10	Champions League	QR3	(Austria) Red Bull Salzburg	1–2	1–1	2–3
2009–10	Europa League	PO	(Scotland) Heart of Midlothian	4–0	0–2	4–2
2009–10	Europa League	GS	(Netherlands) Ajax	0–2	1–2	3rd out of 4
2009–10	Europa League	GS	(Belgium) Anderlecht	0–2	1–0	3rd out of 4
2009–10	Europa League	GS	(Romania) Timișoara	1–2	3–0	3rd out of 4
2010–11	Champions League	QR2	(Slovenia) Koper	5–1	0–3	5–4
2010–11	Champions League	QR3	(Moldova) Sheriff Tiraspol	1–1	1–1	2–2 (5–6 p)
2010–11	Europa League	PO	(Hungary) Győr	2–1	2–0	4–1
2010–11	Europa League	GS	(Belgium) Club Brugge	0–0	2–0	3rd out of 4
2010–11	Europa League	GS	(Greece) PAOK	0–1	0–1	3rd out of 4
2010–11	Europa League	GS	(Spain) Villarreal	2–0	0–3	3rd out of 4
2011–12	Champions League	QR2	(Azerbaijan) Neftçi	3–0	0–0	3–0
2011–12	Champions League	QR3	(Finland) HJK	1–0	2–1	3–1
2011–12	Champions League	PO	(Sweden) Malmö FF	4–1	0–2	4–3
2011–12	Champions League	GS	(Netherlands) Ajax	0–2	0–4	4th out of 4
2011–12	Champions League	GS	(France) Lyon	1–7	0–2	4th out of 4
2011–12	Champions League	GS	(Spain) Real Madrid	0–1	2–6	4th out of 4
2012–13	Champions League	QR2	(Bulgaria) Ludogorets Razgrad	3–2	1–1	4–3
2012–13	Champions League	QR3	(Moldova) Sheriff Tiraspol	4–0	1–0	5–0
2012–13	Champions League	PO	(Slovenia) Maribor	2–1	1–0	3–1
2012–13	Champions League	GS	(Ukraine) Dynamo Kyiv	1–1	0–2	4th out of 4
2012–13	Champions League	GS	(France) Paris Saint-Germain	0–2	0–4	4th out of 4
2012–13	Champions League	GS	(Portugal) Porto	0–2	0–3	4th out of 4
2013–14	Champions League	QR2	(Luxembourg) Fola Esch	1–0	5–0	6–0
2013–14	Champions League	QR3	(Moldova) Sheriff Tiraspol	1–0	3–0	4–0
2013–14	Champions League	PO	Austria Vienna	0–2	3–2	3–4
2013–14	Europa League	GS	(Ukraine) Chornomorets Odesa	1–2	1–2	4th out of 4
2013–14	Europa League	GS	(Bulgaria) Ludogorets Razgrad	1–2	0–3	4th out of 4
2013–14	Europa League	GS	(Netherlands) PSV Eindhoven	0–0	0–2	4th out of 4
2014–15	Champions League	QR2	(Lithuania) Žalgiris	2–0	2–0	4–0
2014–15	Champions League	QR3	(Denmark) AaB	0–2	1–0	1–2
2014–15	Europa League	PO	(Romania) Petrolul Ploiești	2–1	3–1	5–2
2014–15	Europa League	GS	(Romania) Astra Giurgiu	5–1	0–1	3rd out of 4
2014–15	Europa League	GS	(Scotland) Celtic	4–3	0–1	3rd out of 4
2014–15	Europa League	GS	(Austria) Red Bull Salzburg	1–5	2–4	3rd out of 4
2015–16	Champions League	QR2	(Luxembourg) Fola Esch	1–1	3–0	4–1
2015–16	Champions League	QR3	(Norway) Molde	1–1	3–3	4–4 (a)
2015–16	Champions League	PO	(Albania) Skënderbeu	4–1	2–1	6–2
2015–16	Champions League	GS	(England) Arsenal	2–1	0–3	4th out of 4
2015–16	Champions League	GS	(Germany) Bayern Munich	0–2	0–5	4th out of 4
2015–16	Champions League	GS	(Greece) Olympiacos	0–1	1–2	4th out of 4
2016–17	Champions League	QR2	(North Macedonia) Vardar	3–2	2–1	5–3
2016–17	Champions League	QR3	(Georgia (country)) Dinamo Tbilisi	2–0	1–0	3–0
2016–17	Champions League	PO	(Austria) Red Bull Salzburg	1–1	2–1 (a.e.t.)	3–2
2016–17	Champions League	GS	(France) Lyon	0–1	0–3	4th out of 4
2016–17	Champions League	GS	(Italy) Juventus	0–4	0–2	4th out of 4
2016–17	Champions League	GS	(Spain) Sevilla	0–1	0–4	4th out of 4
2017–18	Europa League	QR3	(Norway) Odds	2–1	0–0	2–1
2017–18	Europa League	PO	(Albania) Skënderbeu	1–1	0–0	1–1 (a)
2018–19	Champions League	QR2	(Israel) Hapoel Be'er Sheva	5–0	2–2	7–2
2018–19	Champions League	QR3	(Kazakhstan) Astana	1–0	2–0	3–0
2018–19	Champions League	PO	(Switzerland) Young Boys	1–2	1–1	2–3
2018–19	Europa League	GS	(Turkey) Fenerbahçe	4–1	0–0	1st out of 4
2018–19	Europa League	GS	(Belgium) Anderlecht	0–0	2–0	1st out of 4
2018–19	Europa League	GS	(Slovakia) Spartak Trnava	3–1	2–1	1st out of 4
2018–19	Europa League	R32	(Czech Republic) Viktoria Plzeň	3–0	1–2	4–2
2018–19	Europa League	R16	(Portugal) Benfica	1–0	0–3 (a.e.t.)	1–3
2019–20	Champions League	QR2	(Georgia (country)) Saburtalo Tbilisi	3–0	2–0	5–0
2019–20	Champions League	QR3	(Hungary) Ferencváros	1–1	4–0	5–1
2019–20	Champions League	PO	(Norway) Rosenborg	2–0	1–1	3–1
2019–20	Champions League	GS	(Italy) Atalanta	4–0	0–2	4th out of 4
2019–20	Champions League	GS	(England) Manchester City	1–4	0–2	4th out of 4
2019–20	Champions League	GS	(Ukraine) Shakhtar Donetsk	3–3	2–2	4th out of 4
2020–21	Champions League	QR2	(Romania) CFR Cluj		2–2 (6–5 p)	
2020–21	Champions League	QR3	(Hungary) Ferencváros		1–2	
2020–21	Europa League	PO	(Estonia) Flora Tallinn	3–1		
2020–21	Europa League	GS	(Netherlands) Feyenoord	0–0	2–0	1st out of 4
2020–21	Europa League	GS	(Russia) CSKA Moscow	3–1	0–0	1st out of 4
2020–21	Europa League	GS	(Austria) Wolfsberger AC	1–0	3–0	1st out of 4
2020–21	Europa League	R32	(Russia) Krasnodar	1–0	3–2	4–2
2020–21	Europa League	R16	(England) Tottenham Hotspur	3–0 (a.e.t.)	0–2	3–2
2020–21	Europa League	QF	(Spain) Villarreal	0–1	1–2	1–3
2021–22	Champions League	QR1	(Iceland) Valur	3–2	2–0	5–2
2021–22	Champions League	QR2	(Cyprus) Omonia	2–0	1–0	3–0
2021–22	Champions League	QR3	(Poland) Legia Warsaw	1–1	1–0	2–1
2021–22	Champions League	PO	(Moldova) Sheriff Tiraspol	0–0	0–3	0–3
2021–22	Europa League	GS	(England) West Ham United	0–2	1–0	2nd out of 4
2021–22	Europa League	GS	(Belgium) Genk	1–1	3–0	2nd out of 4
2021–22	Europa League	GS	(Austria) Rapid Vienna	3–1	1–2	2nd out of 4
2021–22	Europa League	KPO	(Spain) Sevilla	1–0	1–3	2–3
2022–23	Champions League	QR2	(North Macedonia) Shkupi	2–2	1–0	3–2
2022–23	Champions League	QR3	(Bulgaria) Ludogorets Razgrad	4–2	2–1	6–3
2022–23	Champions League	PO	(Norway) Bodø/Glimt	4–1 (a.e.t.)	0–1	4–2
2022–23	Champions League	GS	(England) Chelsea	1–0	1–2	4th out of 4
2022–23	Champions League	GS	(Italy) Milan	0–4	1–3	4th out of 4
2022–23	Champions League	GS	(Austria) Red Bull Salzburg	1–1	0–1	4th out of 4
2023–24	Champions League	QR2	(Kazakhstan) Astana	4–0	2–0	6−0
2023–24	Champions League	QR3	(Greece) AEK Athens	1–2	2–2	3–4
2023–24	Europa League	PO	(Czech Republic) Sparta Prague	3–1	1–4	4–5
2023–24	Europa Conference League	GS	(Kazakhstan) Astana	5–1	2–0	2nd out of 4
2023–24	Europa Conference League	GS	(Kosovo) Ballkani	3–0	0–2	2nd out of 4
2023–24	Europa Conference League	GS	(Czech Republic) Viktoria Plzeň	0–1	0–1	2nd out of 4
2023–24	Europa Conference League	KPO	(Spain) Real Betis	1–1	1–0	2–1
2023–24	Europa Conference League	R16	(Greece) PAOK	2–0	1–5	3−5
2024–25	Champions League	PO	(Azerbaijan) Qarabağ	3–0	2–0	5−0
2024–25	Champions League	LP	(Germany) Bayern Munich		2–9	25th out of 36
2024–25	Champions League	LP	(France) Monaco	2–2		25th out of 36
2024–25	Champions League	LP	(Austria) Red Bull Salzburg		2–0	25th out of 36
2024–25	Champions League	LP	(Slovakia) Slovan Bratislava		4–1	25th out of 36
2024–25	Champions League	LP	(Germany) Borussia Dortmund	0–3		25th out of 36
2024–25	Champions League	LP	(Scotland) Celtic	0–0		25th out of 36
2024–25	Champions League	LP	(England) Arsenal		0–3	25th out of 36
2024–25	Champions League	LP	(Italy) Milan	2–1		25th out of 36
2025–26	Europa League	LP	(Turkey) Fenerbahçe	3–1		23rd out of 36
2025–26	Europa League	LP	(Israel) Maccabi Tel Aviv		3–1	23rd out of 36
2025–26	Europa League	LP	(Sweden) Malmö FF		1–1	23rd out of 36
2025–26	Europa League	LP	(Spain) Celta Vigo	0–3		23rd out of 36
2025–26	Europa League	LP	(France) Lille		0–4	23rd out of 36
2025–26	Europa League	LP	(Spain) Real Betis	1–3		23rd out of 36
2025–26	Europa League	LP	(Romania) FCSB	4–1		23rd out of 36
2025–26	Europa League	LP	(Denmark) Midtjylland		0–2	23rd out of 36
2025–26	Europa League	KPO	(Belgium) Genk	1–3	3–3 (a.e.t.)	4–6
2026–27	Champions League	QR2	(Switzerland) Thun	3–2 (a.e.t.)	1–1	4–3
2026–27	Champions League	QR3	(Lithuania) Kauno Žalgiris	5–0	2–1	7–1
2026–27	Champions League	PO	(Norway) Viking	2–2	1–3	3−5
2026–27	Europa League	League phase	(Israel) Hapoel Be'er Sheva		0–0	TBD
2026–27	Europa League	League phase	(Belgium) Anderlecht	1–0		TBD
2026–27	Europa League	League phase	(Netherlands) NEC			TBD
2026–27	Europa League	League phase	(England) Sunderland			TBD
2026–27	Europa League	League phase	(Germany) Bayer Leverkusen			TBD
2026–27	Europa League	League phase	(France) Rennes			TBD
2026–27	Europa League	League phase	(Netherlands) AZ			TBD
2026–27	Europa League	League phase	(Austria) Sturm Graz			TBD

Last updated: 26 August 2026

== List of opponents ==
=== List of opponents by nation ===
Last match updated: Viking - Dinamo Zagreb 3–1 (26 August 2026)

Nat.	Pld	W	D	L	GF	GA	GD
Albania	6	4	2	0	17	5	+12
Armenia	2	1	1	0	3	0	+3
Austria	22	8	6	8	29	28	+1
Azerbaijan	6	4	2	0	12	2	+10
Belgium	14	7	4	3	24	14	+10
Bulgaria	8	5	1	2	19	13	+6
Cyprus	2	2	0	0	3	0	+3
(Czech Republic) Czech Republic^{TCH}	14	4	4	6	18	18	0
Denmark	5	2	1	2	10	8	+2
England	22	5	3	14	17	39	−22
Estonia	3	3	0	0	5	1	+4
Faroe Islands	2	2	0	0	11	0	+11
Finland	2	2	0	0	3	1	+2
France	19	3	4	12	17	43	−26
(Georgia (country)) Georgia	4	4	0	0	8	0	+8
(Germany) Germany^{GER}	20	3	4	13	24	45	−21
Greece	14	3	2	9	17	23	−6
Hungary	15	10	3	2	28	8	+20
Iceland	2	2	0	0	5	2	+3
Israel	5	2	3	0	13	6	+7
Italy	30	6	7	17	26	49	−23
Kazakhstan	6	6	0	0	16	1	+15
Kosovo	2	1	0	1	3	2	+1
Lithuania	6	6	0	0	20	4	+16
Luxembourg	4	3	1	0	10	1	+9
Moldova	8	4	3	1	11	5	+6
Netherlands	16	4	5	7	14	22	−8
North Macedonia	4	3	1	0	8	5	+3
Northern Ireland	2	1	1	0	3	1	+2
Norway	11	3	5	3	17	15	+2
Poland	2	1	1	0	2	1	+1
Portugal	17	6	2	9	15	25	−10
Romania	18	12	2	4	39	16	+23
Russia	7	4	1	2	10	7	+3
Scotland	11	5	1	5	17	15	+2
(Serbia) Serbia^{SCG}	2	1	0	1	5	1	+4
(Slovakia) Slovakia^{TCH}	7	5	2	0	16	4	+12
Slovenia	12	9	1	2	26	13	+13
Spain	22	3	3	16	15	46	−31
Sweden	5	2	2	1	7	4	+3
Switzerland	7	2	4	1	15	10	+5
Turkey	7	3	2	2	12	7	+5
Ukraine	12	0	4	8	11	25	−14
Total	402	165	88	150	597	525	72

^{GER} – Including matches against German clubs representing East Germany and West Germany in European competitions.
^{SCG} – Including matches against Serbian clubs representing Serbia and Montenegro in European competitions.
^{TCH} – Including matches against Czech and Slovak clubs representing Czechoslovakia in European competitions.

=== List of opponents by club ===
Last match updated: Dinamo Zagreb - Anderlecht 1-0 (15 October 2026)

Club	Pld	W	D	L	GF	GA	GD
(Albania) KF Tirana	2	2	0	0	10	2	+8
(Albania) Skënderbeu	4	2	2	0	7	3	+4
(Armenia) Pyunik	2	1	1	0	3	0	+3
Austria Wien	2	1	0	1	3	4	−1
(Austria) LASK	3	1	1	1	2	2	0
(Austria) Rapid Wien	4	1	2	1	6	5	+1
(Austria) Red Bull Salzburg	8	2	3	4	11	16	−5
(Austria) Sturm Graz	2	1	0	1	3	1	+2
(Austria) Wolfsberger AC	2	2	0	0	4	0	+4
(Azerbaijan) Khazar Lankaran	2	1	1	0	4	2	+2
(Azerbaijan) Neftçi	2	1	1	0	3	0	+3
(Azerbaijan) Qarabağ	2	2	0	0	5	0	+5
(Belgium) Anderlecht	5	3	1	1	4	2	+1
(Belgium) Beveren	1	1	0	0	6	1	+5
(Belgium) Club Brugge	2	1	1	0	2	0	+2
(Belgium) Genk	4	1	2	1	8	7	+1
(Belgium) Union Saint-Gilloise	3	2	0	1	5	4	+1
(Bulgaria) Botev Vratsa	2	2	0	0	8	2	+6
(Bulgaria) Ludogorets Razgrad	6	3	1	2	11	11	0
(Cyprus) Omonia	2	2	0	0	3	0	+3
(Czech Republic) Sparta Prague	4	1	2	1	7	8	–1
(Czech Republic) Viktoria Plzeň	4	1	0	3	4	4	0
(Czech Republic) Dukla Prague	2	0	1	1	3	4	−1
(Czech Republic) Rudá Hvězda Brno	2	1	1	0	2	0	+2
(Czech Republic) Spartak ZJŠ Brno	2	1	0	1	2	2	0
(Denmark) AaB	2	1	0	1	1	2	−1
(Denmark) Midtjylland	1	0	0	1	0	2	−2
(Denmark) Stævnet	2	1	1	0	9	4	+5
(England) Arsenal	5	1	0	4	3	12	−9
(England) Chelsea	2	1	0	1	2	2	0
(England) Fulham	2	0	0	2	1	5	−4
(England) Leeds United	2	1	1	0	2	0	+2
(England) Manchester City	2	0	0	2	1	6	−5
(England) Manchester United	2	0	1	1	1	2	−1
(England) Newcastle United	2	0	1	1	3	4	−1
(England) Tottenham Hotspur	3	1	0	2	3	6	−3
(England) West Ham United	2	1	0	1	1	2	–1
(Estonia) Flora	3	3	0	0	5	1	+4
(Faroe Islands) B68 Toftir	2	2	0	0	11	0	+11
(Finland) HJK	2	2	0	0	3	1	+2
(France) Auxerre	6	2	0	4	7	12	−5
(France) Lille	1	0	0	1	0	4	−4
(France) Lyon	4	0	0	4	1	13	−12
(France) Marseille	4	1	2	1	6	5	+1
(France) Monaco	1	0	1	0	2	2	+0
(France) Paris Saint-Germain	2	0	0	2	0	6	−6
(France) Rennes	1	0	1	0	1	1	0
(Georgia (country)) Dinamo Tbilisi	2	2	0	0	3	0	+3
(Georgia (country)) Saburtalo Tbilisi	2	2	0	0	5	0	+5
(Germany) 1. FC Magdeburg	2	0	1	1	2	4	−2
(Germany) Borussia Dortmund	1	0	0	1	0	3	−3
(Germany) Eintracht Frankfurt	2	1	0	1	4	3	+1
(Germany) Bayern Munich	5	1	1	3	6	17	−11
(Germany) Schalke 04	2	0	1	1	2	4	−2
(Germany) Hamburger SV	3	1	0	2	4	3	+1
(Germany) Werder Bremen	2	0	0	2	3	5	−2
(Germany) VfB Stuttgart	3	0	1	2	3	6	−3
(Greece) AEK Athens	4	1	1	2	6	6	0
(Greece) Olympiacos	6	1	1	4	8	10	−2
(Greece) PAOK	4	1	0	3	3	7	0
(Hungary) Ferencváros	5	3	1	1	9	4	+5
(Hungary) Győr	2	2	0	0	3	1	+2
(Hungary) MTK Budapest	6	3	2	1	7	2	+5
(Hungary) Zalaegerszeg	2	2	0	0	9	1	+8
(Israel) Hapoel Be'er Sheva	2	1	1	0	7	2	+5
(Israel) Maccabi Tel Aviv	3	1	2	0	6	4	+2
(Iceland) Valur	2	2	0	0	5	2	+3
(Italy) Atalanta	4	1	2	1	5	3	+2
(Italy) Bologna	2	0	1	1	1	2	−1
(Italy) Fiorentina	4	1	1	2	4	7	−3
(Italy) Juventus	4	1	1	2	5	8	−3
(Italy) Milan	7	1	0	6	5	18	−13
(Italy) Parma	2	1	0	1	1	2	−1
(Italy) Perugia	2	0	1	1	0	1	−1
(Italy) Torino	4	1	1	2	4	6	−2
(Italy) Udinese	1	0	0	1	1	2	−1
(Kazakhstan) Astana	6	6	0	0	16	1	+15
(Kosovo) Ballkani	2	1	0	1	3	2	+1
(Lithuania) Ekranas	2	2	0	0	9	3	+6
(Lithuania) Kauno Žalgiris	2	2	0	0	7	1	+6
(Lithuania) Žalgiris	2	2	0	0	4	0	+4
(Luxembourg) Fola Esch	4	3	1	0	10	1	+9
(Moldova) Sheriff Tiraspol	8	4	3	1	11	5	+6
(Netherlands) Ajax	8	2	1	5	5	13	−8
(Netherlands) Feyenoord	2	1	1	0	2	0	+2
(Netherlands) Twente	2	0	1	1	2	3	−1
(Netherlands) Heerenveen	1	0	1	0	2	2	0
(Netherlands) NEC	1	1	0	0	3	2	+1
(Netherlands) PSV Eindhoven	2	0	1	1	0	2	−2
(North Macedonia) Shkupi	2	1	1	0	3	2	+1
(North Macedonia) Vardar	2	2	0	0	5	3	+2
(Northern Ireland) Linfield	2	1	1	0	3	1	+2
(Norway) Bodø/Glimt	2	1	0	1	4	2	+2
(Norway) Brann	1	0	0	1	1	2	−1
(Norway) Molde	2	0	2	0	4	4	0
(Norway) Odds	2	1	1	0	2	1	+1
(Norway) Rosenborg	2	1	1	0	3	1	+2
(Norway) Viking	2	0	1	1	3	5	−2
(Poland) Legia Warsaw	2	1	1	0	2	1	+1
(Portugal) Barreirense	2	1	0	1	6	3	+3
(Portugal) Benfica	5	1	1	3	1	5	−4
(Portugal) Porto	8	3	1	4	7	12	−5
(Portugal) Sporting CP	2	1	0	1	1	3	−2
(Romania) ASA Târgu Mureș	2	2	0	0	4	0	+4
(Romania) CFR Cluj	1	0	1	0	2	2	0
(Romania) Astra Giurgiu	2	1	0	1	5	3	+2
(Romania) Argeș Pitești	2	1	1	0	1	0	+1
(Romania) Petrolul Ploiești	4	3	0	1	10	4	+6
(Romania) Steaua București	5	4	0	1	13	6	+7
(Romania) FC Politehnica Timișoara	2	1	0	1	4	2	+2
(Russia) CSKA Moscow	2	1	1	0	3	1	+2
(Russia) Krasnodar	2	2	0	0	4	2	+2
(Russia) Spartak Moscow	3	1	0	2	3	4	−1
(Scotland) Celtic	7	3	1	3	9	9	0
(Scotland) Dunfermline Athletic	2	1	0	1	4	4	0
(Scotland) Heart of Midlothian	2	1	0	1	4	2	+2
(Serbia) Partizan	2	1	0	1	5	1	+4
(Slovakia) Slovan Bratislava	5	3	2	0	11	2	+9
(Slovakia) Spartak Trnava	2	2	0	0	5	2	+3
(Slovenia) Domžale	4	4	0	0	11	4	+7
(Slovenia) Koper	2	1	0	1	5	4	+1
(Slovenia) Maribor	4	3	1	0	6	3	+3
(Slovenia) Primorje	2	1	0	1	4	2	+2
(Spain) Atlético Madrid	4	0	1	3	1	7	−6
(Spain) Barcelona	2	0	1	1	3	7	−4
(Spain) Celta Vigo	1	0	0	1	0	3	−3
(Spain) Real Betis	3	1	1	1	3	4	−1
(Spain) Real Madrid	2	0	0	2	2	7	−5
(Spain) Sevilla	4	1	0	3	2	8	−6
(Spain) Valencia	2	0	0	2	1	4	−3
(Spain) Villarreal	4	1	0	3	3	6	−3
(Sweden) IF Elfsborg	2	1	1	0	2	0	+2
(Sweden) Malmö FF	3	1	1	1	5	4	+1
(Switzerland) Basel	1	0	1	0	0	0	0
(Switzerland) Grasshopper	2	1	1	0	9	4	+5
(Switzerland) Thun	2	1	1	0	4	3	+1
(Switzerland) Young Boys	2	0	1	1	2	3	−1
(Turkey) Beşiktaş	2	1	0	1	2	1	+1
(Turkey) Fenerbahçe	3	2	1	0	7	2	+5
(Turkey) Trabzonspor	2	0	1	1	3	4	−1
(Ukraine) Chornomorets Odesa	2	0	0	2	2	4	−2
(Ukraine) Dnipro Dnipropetrovsk	2	0	1	1	1	3	−2
(Ukraine) Dynamo Kyiv	4	0	1	3	2	8	−6
(Ukraine) Shakhtar Donetsk	4	0	2	2	6	10	−4
Total	403	165	88	150	597	525	72

== Player records ==
Last updated after match against (Azerbaijan) Qarabağ on 28 August 2024.

=== Most appearances in UEFA club competitions ===
1. Arijan Ademi: 104 appearances
2. Bruno Petković: 76 appearances
3. Sammir: 76 appearances
4. Dominik Livaković: 75 appearances
5. Mislav Oršić: 70 appearances
6. Kévin Théophile-Catherine: 56 appearances
7. Amer Gojak: 53 appearances
8. Milan Badelj: 52 appearances
9. Rudolf Belin: 49 appearances
10. Mihael Mikić: 48 appearances
11. Edin Mujčin: 48 appearances
12. Petar Stojanović: 48 appearances

=== Top scorers in UEFA club competitions ===
1. Mislav Oršić: 28 goals
2. Bruno Petković: 28 goals
3. Igor Cvitanović: 15 goals
4. Slaven Zambata: 15 goals
5. Sammir: 13 goals
6. Hillal Soudani: 13 goals
7. Arijan Ademi: 13 goals
8. Mario Mandžukić: 11 goals
9. Marijan Novak: 10 goals
10. Dražan Jerković: 9 goals

== UEFA team ranking ==
The following data indicates Dinamo coefficient rankings.

As of 8 November 2024

Rank	Team	Points
33	(Spain) Real Sociedad	54.000
34	(France) Lille	53.000
35	(Croatia) Dinamo Zagreb	53.000
36	(Ukraine) Shakhtar Donetsk	50.000
37	(Czech Republic) Slavia Prague	50.000
