= Krasnodar Rora =

Croatian footballer (1945–2020)

Personal information
- Full name: Krasnodar Rora
- Date of birth: 23 March 1945
- Place of birth: Vis, FS Croatia, Yugoslavia
- Date of death: 12 November 2020 (aged 75)
- Place of death: Zagreb, Croatia
- Height: 1.78 m (5 ft 10 in)
- Position: Midfielder

Senior career*
Years	Team	Apps	(Gls)
1962–1964	Šibenik	50	(8)
1964–1973	Dinamo Zagreb	222	(37)
1973–1975	Standard Liège	48	(2)
1975–1977	Nancy	21	(1)
1977–1978	Hagenau	31	(2)
Total		372	(50)

International career
1967–1968	Yugoslavia	5	(0)

Managerial career
- 1992: Radnik Velika Gorica
- 1992–1993: Šibenik
- 1998: Cibalia
- * Club domestic league appearances and goals

Krasnodar Rora (23 March 1945 – 12 November 2020) was a Croatian professional football player and manager.

== Club career ==
Rising through the ranks at Šibenik, Rora rose to prominence as a key player of the local powerhouse Dinamo Zagreb in the late 1960s and early 1970s, and was part of the club's golden generation which won the 1967 Inter-Cities Fairs Cup, the team's first and only European silverware.

After turning 28, the minimum legal age for Yugoslav players to move abroad, he played for Standard Liège in Belgium under fellow Yugoslavs Vlatko Marković and Nedeljko Bulatović, before moving on to France in 1975 where he spent two seasons at AS Nancy alongside the young Michel Platini under coach Antoine Redin.

== International career ==
Rora also earned five caps for Yugoslavia in 1967 and 1968, under the tenure of national manager Rajko Mitić, alongside several of his Dinamo teammates from the 1967 Inter-Cities Fairs Cup final such as Rudolf Belin, Mladen Ramljak, and Slaven Zambata. However, the only two Dinamo players Mitić eventually called up for the UEFA Euro 1968 final four tournament in June were Belin and Ramljak, with Yugoslavia eventually winning the silver medal. His final international was an October 1968 World Cup qualification match against Spain.

== Post-playing career ==
Rora retired from playing in 1978 at the age of 33 after a single season with a small French second-level side SR Hagenau under manager Raymond Hild, where he helped them win the regional Alsace Cup. In 1983, he had a short stint as assistant manager of Branko Zebec at Eintracht Frankfurt replacing Ulrich Meyer.

He then moved back to his homeland and worked as a youth coach at Dinamo Zagreb and also had managerial stints at Radnički Kragujevac and at smaller Croatian clubs Radnik Velika Gorica, Cibalia, as well as his original club Šibenik.

== Personal life ==
=== Death ===
He died on 12 November 2020 in Zagreb, aged 75.

== Honours ==
Dinamo Zagreb

- Inter-Cities Fairs Cup: 1966–67
- Yugoslav Football Cup: 1964–65, 1968–69
