= 1963 Inter-Cities Fairs Cup final =

- Event: 1962–63 Inter-Cities Fairs Cup
Dinamo Zagreb	Valencia
(Socialist Federal Republic of Yugoslavia)	(Spain)
1	4
- on aggregate

First leg
Dinamo Zagreb	Valencia
1	2
- Date: 12 June 1963
- Venue: Maksimir Stadium, Zagreb
- Referee: Giuseppe Adami (Italy)
- Attendance: 40,000

Second leg
Valencia	Dinamo Zagreb
2	0
- Date: 26 June 1963
- Venue: Estadio Luís Casanova, Valencia
- Referee: Kevin Howley (England)
- Attendance: 55,000

The 1963 Inter-Cities Fairs Cup final was the final of the fifth Inter-Cities Fairs Cup. It was played on 12 June and 26 June 1963 between Dinamo Zagreb of Yugoslavia and Valencia CF of Spain.

Valencia claimed their second major European trophy as they successfully defended their title by winning the tie 4–1 on aggregate. It was the first time in the competition that a team won both legs of the final.

== Route to the final ==
Both finalists' second-round ties went to a play-off match. After drawing 2–2 on aggregate against Belgian side Royale Union Saint-Gilloise, Dinamo won the decisive replay 3–2. The replay was held at a neutral venue, the Gugl-Stadion in Linz, Austria. Meanwhile, holders Valencia blew a four-goal lead in the second leg away to Dunfermline Athletic–– a side managed by future Celtic boss Jock Stein–– which left the tie deadlocked at 6–6. Los Che won 1–0 in their replay, which was played at the neutral Estádio do Restelo in Lisbon. (This was before the institution of the away goals rule in UEFA competitions.)

Perhaps a bit unusually, the first three opponents that Valencia faced in the competition were all clubs from Scotland.

Dinamo Zagreb					Round	Valencia				
Opponent	Agg.	1st leg	2nd leg	Replay (if necessary)		Opponent	Agg.	1st leg	2nd leg	Replay (if necessary)
(Portugal) Porto	2–1	2–1 (A)	0–0 (H)		First round	(Scotland) Celtic	6–4	4–2 (H)	2–2 (A)	
(Belgium) Union Saint-Gilloise	2–2	2–1 (H)	0–1 (A)	3–2 (N)	Second round	(Scotland) Dunfermline Athletic	6–6	4–0 (H)	2–6 (A)	1–0 (N)
(West Germany) Bayern München	4–1	4–1 (A)	0–0 (H)		Quarter-finals	(Scotland) Hibernian	6–2	5–0 (H)	1–2 (A)	
(Hungary) Ferencváros	3–1	1–0 (A)	2–1 (H)		Semi-finals	(Italy) Roma	3–1	3–0 (H)	0–1 (A)	

== Match details ==
=== First leg ===
12 June 1963

Dinamo Zagreb (Socialist Federal Republic of Yugoslavia)	1–2	(Spain) Valencia
Zambata 13'		Waldo 64'; Urtiaga 67'

Maksimir Stadium, Zagreb
Attendance: 40,000
Referee: Giuseppe Adami (Italy)

Dinamo Zagreb
Valencia

GK	1	(Socialist Federal Republic of Yugoslavia) Zlatko Škorić
(Socialist Federal Republic of Yugoslavia) Rudolf Belin
(Socialist Federal Republic of Yugoslavia) Mirko Braun
(Socialist Federal Republic of Yugoslavia) Marijan Bišćan
(Socialist Federal Republic of Yugoslavia) Vlatko Marković
(Socialist Federal Republic of Yugoslavia) Željko Perušić
(Socialist Federal Republic of Yugoslavia) Zdenko Kobeščak
(Socialist Federal Republic of Yugoslavia) Slaven Zambata
(Socialist Federal Republic of Yugoslavia) Tomislav Knez
(Socialist Federal Republic of Yugoslavia) Željko Matuš
(Socialist Federal Republic of Yugoslavia) Stjepan Lamza
Manager:
(Socialist Federal Republic of Yugoslavia) Milan Antolković

GK	1	(Spain) Ricardo Zamora de Grassa
(Spain) Vicente Piquer
(Brazil) Chicão
(Spain) Paquito
(Spain) Quincoces
(Spain) José Sastre
(Spain) Daniel Mañó
(Argentina) José María Sánchez Lage
(Brazil) Waldo
(Spain) Enric Ribelles
(Spain) José Antonio Urtiaga
Manager:
(Argentina) Alejandro Scopelli

=== Second leg ===
26 June 1963

Valencia (Spain)	2–0	(Socialist Federal Republic of Yugoslavia) Dinamo Zagreb
Mañó 68'; Nuñez 78'

Estadio Mestalla, Valencia
Attendance: 55,000
Referee: Kevin Howley (England)

Valencia
Dinamo Zagreb

GK	1	(Spain) Ricardo Zamora de Grassa
(Spain) Vicente Piquer
(Brazil) Chicão
(Spain) Paquito
(Spain) Quincoces
(Spain) José Sastre
(Spain) Daniel Mañó
(Argentina) José María Sánchez Lage
(Brazil) Waldo
(Spain) Enric Ribelles
(Uruguay) Héctor Núñez
Manager:
(Argentina) Alejandro Scopelli

GK	1	(Socialist Federal Republic of Yugoslavia) Zlatko Škorić
(Socialist Federal Republic of Yugoslavia) Rudolf Belin
(Socialist Federal Republic of Yugoslavia) Mirko Braun
(Socialist Federal Republic of Yugoslavia) Zdravko Rauš
(Socialist Federal Republic of Yugoslavia) Vlatko Marković
(Socialist Federal Republic of Yugoslavia) Željko Perušić
(Socialist Federal Republic of Yugoslavia) Zdenko Kobeščak
(Socialist Federal Republic of Yugoslavia) Slaven Zambata
(Socialist Federal Republic of Yugoslavia) Tomislav Knez
(Socialist Federal Republic of Yugoslavia) Željko Matuš
(Socialist Federal Republic of Yugoslavia) Stjepan Lamza
Manager:
(Socialist Federal Republic of Yugoslavia) Milan Antolković

== See also ==
- 1962–63 Inter-Cities Fairs Cup
- GNK Dinamo Zagreb in European football
- Valencia CF in European football
