= 1964–65 Yugoslav Cup =

1965 Yugoslav Football Cup
18th Marshal Tito Cup

Tournament details
- Country: Yugoslavia
- Dates: 31 March – 26 May
- Teams: 16

Final positions
- Champions: Dinamo Zagreb (4th title)
- Runners-up: Budućnost
- Cup Winners' Cup: Dinamo Zagreb

Tournament statistics
- Matches played: 15
- Goals scored: 40 (2.67 per match)
- Goals scored in penalty shoot-outs not included.

The 1964–65 Yugoslav Cup was the 18th season of the top football knockout competition in SFR Yugoslavia, the Yugoslav Cup (Serbo-Croatian: Kup Jugoslavije), also known as the "Marshal Tito Cup" (Kup Maršala Tita), since its establishment in 1946.

== First round proper ==
In the following tables winning teams are marked in bold; teams from outside top division are indicated with Roman numerals, corresponding to their league level.

Tie no	Home team	Score	Away team
1	**Budućnost** (II)	1–0	Radnički Beograd (II)
2	**Dinamo Zagreb**	3–0	Partizan
3	Kladivar Celje (II)	0–1	**Novi Sad** (II)
4	**OFK Beograd**	2–0	Hajduk Split
5	**Radnički Niš**	1–0	Rijeka
6	**Trešnjevka**	3–0 (a.e.t.)	Sloboda Tuzla (II)
7	**Vardar**	1–0	Sarajevo
8	Vojvodina	0–0 (2–3 p)	**Red Star**

== Quarter-finals ==
Tie no	Home team	Score	Away team
1	**Budućnost** (II)	3–2	OFK Beograd
2	**Dinamo Zagreb**	6–0	Trešnjevka
3	**Red Star**	7–1	Novi Sad (II)
4	**Vardar**	2–0	Radnički Niš

== Semi-finals ==
Tie no	Home team	Score	Away team
1	Red Star	0–2	**Dinamo Zagreb**
2	Vardar	0–2	Budućnost Titograd (II)

== Final ==
26 May 1965

Dinamo Zagreb	2–1	Budućnost
Zambata 19', 29'		Franović 35'

Stadion Crvena Zvezda, Belgrade
Attendance: 13,000
Referee: V. Stanković (Belgrade)

DINAMO ZAGREB:
GK	1	(Socialist Federal Republic of Yugoslavia) Zlatko Škorić
DF	2	(Socialist Federal Republic of Yugoslavia) Mladen Ramljak
DF	3	(Socialist Federal Republic of Yugoslavia) Zlatko Mesić
DF	4	(Socialist Federal Republic of Yugoslavia) Miljenko Puljčan
DF	5	(Socialist Federal Republic of Yugoslavia) Adem Kasumović
MF	6	(Socialist Federal Republic of Yugoslavia) Rudolf Belin
MF	7	(Socialist Federal Republic of Yugoslavia) Denijal Pirić
FW	8	(Socialist Federal Republic of Yugoslavia) Slaven Zambata
FW	9	(Socialist Federal Republic of Yugoslavia) Dražan Jerković (c)
FW	10	(Socialist Federal Republic of Yugoslavia) Željko Matuš
MF	11	(Socialist Federal Republic of Yugoslavia) Stjepan Lamza
Manager:
(Socialist Federal Republic of Yugoslavia) Vlatko Konjevod

BUDUĆNOST:
GK	1	(Socialist Federal Republic of Yugoslavia) Jovan Hajduković
DF	2	(Socialist Federal Republic of Yugoslavia) Milutin Folić
DF	3	(Socialist Federal Republic of Yugoslavia) Vojo Gardašević
DF	4	(Socialist Federal Republic of Yugoslavia) Spasoje Pavlović
	5	(Socialist Federal Republic of Yugoslavia) Cvetko Savković
	6	(Socialist Federal Republic of Yugoslavia) Slobodan Kovačević	Substituted off
	7	(Socialist Federal Republic of Yugoslavia) Dragoljub Šaković
MF	8	(Socialist Federal Republic of Yugoslavia) Desimir Todorović
	9	(Socialist Federal Republic of Yugoslavia) Ištvan Šorban
	10	(Socialist Federal Republic of Yugoslavia) Gano Ćerić
	11	(Socialist Federal Republic of Yugoslavia) Vlatko Franović
Substitutes:
		(Socialist Federal Republic of Yugoslavia) Miloš Ivanović	Substituted on
Manager:
(Socialist Federal Republic of Yugoslavia) Božidar Dedović

== See also ==
- 1964–65 Yugoslav First League
- 1964–65 Yugoslav Second League
