= 1965–66 Yugoslav Second League =

Yugoslav Second League
- Season: 1965–66
- Champions: Čelik (West Division); Sutjeska (East Division)
- Promoted: Čelik; Sutjeska
- Relegated: RNK Split; Zadar; Slovan; Sloga Kraljevo; Srem; Novi Sad

The 1965–66 Yugoslav Second League season was the 20th season of the Second Federal League (Serbo-Croatian: Druga savezna liga), the second level association football competition of SFR Yugoslavia, since its establishment in 1946. The league was contested in two regional groups (West Division and East Division), with 18 clubs each, two more than in the previous season.

== West Division ==
=== Teams ===
A total of eighteen teams contested the league, including thirteen sides from the 1964–65 season and five sides promoted from the third-tier leagues played in the 1964–65 season. The league was contested in a double round robin format, with each club playing every other club twice, for a total of 34 rounds. Two points were awarded for wins and one point for draws.

There were no teams relegated from the 1964–65 Yugoslav First League. The five clubs promoted to the second level were Bosna, Leotar, Segesta, Slovan and Zadar. At the winter break, Slovan abandoned competition due to lack of funding.

Locations of teams' home cities in the 1965–66 Yugoslav Second League West

Team	Location	Federal subject	Position in 1964–65
Borac Banja Luka	Banja Luka	SR Bosnia and Herzegovina	8th
Borovo	Borovo Naselje	SR Croatia	10th
Bosna	Visoko	SR Bosnia and Herzegovina	—N/a
Čelik	Zenica	SR Bosnia and Herzegovina	5th
Famos Hrasnica	Hrasnica	SR Bosnia and Herzegovina	9th
Istra	Pula	SR Croatia	14th
Leotar	Trebinje	SR Bosnia and Herzegovina	—N/a
Lokomotiva Zagreb	Zagreb	SR Croatia	11th
Maribor	Maribor	SR Slovenia	3rd
Slavonija Osijek	Osijek	SR Croatia	6th
Rudar Kakanj	Kakanj	SR Bosnia and Herzegovina	7th
Segesta	Sisak	SR Croatia	—N/a
Sloboda	Tuzla	SR Bosnia and Herzegovina	2nd
Slovan	Ljubljana	SR Slovenia	—N/a
RNK Split	Split	SR Croatia	12th
Šibenik	Šibenik	SR Croatia	4th
Varteks	Varaždin	SR Croatia	13th
Zadar	Zadar	SR Croatia	—N/a

=== League table ===
Pos	Team	Pld	W	D	L	GF	GA	GD	Pts	Promotion or relegation
1	Čelik (C, P)	33	22	7	4	65	27	+38	51	Promotion to Yugoslav First League
2	Sloboda Tuzla	33	20	9	4	72	31	+41	49	
3	Borovo	33	17	8	8	72	31	+41	42	
4	Maribor	33	16	9	8	53	31	+22	41	
5	Lokomotiva Zagreb	33	17	6	10	71	48	+23	40	
6	Šibenik	33	16	4	13	53	51	+2	36	
7	Istra Pula	33	15	5	13	50	48	+2	35	
8	Slavonija	33	11	11	11	47	41	+6	33	
9	Leotar	33	11	9	13	35	44	−9	31	
10	Famos Hrasnica	33	11	8	14	56	50	+6	30	
11	Bosna	33	11	8	14	47	52	−5	30	
12	Borac Banja Luka	33	12	5	16	53	55	−2	29	
13	Segesta	33	13	3	17	51	68	−17	29	
14	Varteks	33	12	3	18	43	52	−9	27	
15	Rudar Kakanj	33	8	9	16	38	57	−19	25	
16	RNK Split (R)	33	5	11	17	32	62	−30	21	Relegation to Third Level
17	Zadar (R)	33	8	5	20	40	89	−49	21	Relegation to Third Level
18	Slovan (R)	17	2	4	11	14	57	−43	8	Relegation to Third Level

Source: fsgzrenjanin.com
Rules for classification: 1) points; 2) goal difference; 3) number of goals scored.
(C) Champions; (P) Promoted; (R) Relegated

== East Division ==
=== Teams ===
A total of eighteen teams contested the league, including thirteen sides from the 1964–65 season, one club relegated from the 1964–65 Yugoslav First League and four sides promoted from the third-tier leagues played in the 1964–65 season. The league was contested in a double round robin format, with each club playing every other club twice, for a total of 34 rounds. Two points were awarded for wins and one point for draws.

Sutjeska were relegated from the 1964–65 Yugoslav First League after finishing in the 15th place of the league table. The four clubs promoted to the second level were Lovćen, Radnički Sombor, Sloboda Titovo Užice and Sloga Kraljevo.

Locations of teams' home cities in the 1965–66 Yugoslav Second League East

Team	Location	Federal subject	Position in 1964–65
Bačka	Bačka Palanka	(Socialist Republic of Serbia) SAP Vojvodina	9th
Bor	Bor	SR Serbia	14th
Borac Čačak	Čačak	SR Serbia	10th
Budućnost	Titograd	SR Montenegro	3rd
Lovćen	Cetinje	SR Montenegro	—N/a
Novi Sad	Novi Sad	(Socialist Republic of Serbia) SAP Vojvodina	6th
Pobeda	Prilep	SR Macedonia	12th
Prishtina	Pristina	(Socialist Republic of Serbia) SAP Kosovo	7th
Proleter Zrenjanin	Zrenjanin	(Socialist Republic of Serbia) SAP Vojvodina	2nd
Radnički Sombor	Sombor	(Socialist Republic of Serbia) SAP Vojvodina	—N/a
Sloboda Titovo Užice	Titovo Užice	SR Serbia	—N/a
Sloga Kraljevo	Kraljevo	SR Serbia	—N/a
Spartak Subotica	Subotica	(Socialist Republic of Serbia) SAP Vojvodina	8th
Srem	Sremska Mitrovica	(Socialist Republic of Serbia) SAP Vojvodina	5th
Sutjeska	Nikšić	SR Montenegro	—N/a
Trepča	Kosovska Mitrovica	(Socialist Republic of Serbia) SAP Kosovo	13th
Voždovački	Belgrade	SR Serbia	11th
Železničar Niš	Niš	SR Serbia	4th

=== League table ===
Pos	Team	Pld	W	D	L	GF	GA	GD	Pts	Promotion or relegation
1	Sutjeska Nikšić (C, P)	34	16	10	8	70	45	+25	42	Promotion to Yugoslav First League
2	Proleter Zrenjanin	34	16	10	8	61	39	+22	42	
3	Pobeda	34	17	7	10	59	49	+10	41	
4	Bor	34	16	6	12	48	39	+9	38	
5	Radnički Sombor	34	15	7	12	57	54	+3	37	
6	Voždovački	34	15	7	12	49	54	−5	37	
7	Spartak Subotica	34	15	6	13	50	46	+4	36	
8	Trepča	34	13	10	11	57	53	+4	36	
9	Budućnost	34	13	8	13	45	37	+8	34	
10	Prishtina	34	12	10	12	49	48	+1	34	
11	Železničar Niš	34	12	9	13	50	51	−1	33	
12	Sloboda Titovo Užice (Note: Sloboda Titovo Užice were docked 3 points due to suspected match fixing in the previous season.)	34	11	13	10	42	33	+9	32	
13	Bačka	34	10	10	14	43	49	−6	30	
14	Lovćen	34	11	8	15	42	66	−24	30	
15	Borac Čačak	34	8	13	13	33	42	−9	29	
16	Sloga Kraljevo (Note: Sloga Kraljevo were docked 4 points due to suspected match fixing in the previous season.)	34	10	12	12	48	48	0	28	Relegation to Third Level
17	Srem (R)	34	10	7	17	43	56	−13	27	Relegation to Third Level
18	Novi Sad (R)	34	7	5	22	45	82	−37	19	Relegation to Third Level

Source: fsgzrenjanin.com
Rules for classification: 1) points; 2) goal difference; 3) number of goals scored.
(C) Champions; (P) Promoted; (R) Relegated

== See also ==
- 1965–66 Yugoslav First League
- 1965–66 Yugoslav Cup
