= Zlatko Mesić =

Croatian footballer (1946–2020)

Personal information
- Date of birth: 13 April 1946
- Place of birth: Zagreb, PR Croatia, FPR Yugoslavia
- Date of death: 21 January 2020 (aged 73)
- Place of death: Zagreb, Croatia
- Position: Defender

Senior career*
Years	Team	Apps	(Gls)
1963–1971	Dinamo Zagreb	71	(1)
1971	Toronto Croatia		
- * Club domestic league appearances and goals

Zlatko Mesić (13 April 1946 – 21 January 2020) was a Croatian footballer who had a notable tenure with Dinamo Zagreb in the Yugoslav First League.

== Career ==
Mesić played at the youth level with Dinamo Zagreb, and began his professional career in 1963 in the Yugoslav First League. He made his debut in 1964 against NK Metalac Osijek. Throughout his time with Dinamo he won the 1966–67 Inter-Cities Fairs Cup, 1964–65 Yugoslav Cup, and 1968–69 Yugoslav Cup. In 1971, he went abroad to play in the National Soccer League with Toronto Croatia. In his debut season he won the NSL Championship.

== Personal life ==
=== Death ===
He died on January 21, 2020.
