= Rudolf Belin =

Croatian football player and manager (1942–2025

Rudi Belin
- Belin and Pelé in September 1969

Personal information
- Full name: Rudolf Belin
- Date of birth: 4 November 1942
- Place of birth: Zagreb, Independent State of Croatia
- Date of death: 3 November 2025 (aged 82)
- Place of death: Zagreb, Croatia
- Position: Defender

Youth career
- 1957–1959: Jedinstvo Zagreb
- 1959–1960: Dinamo Zagreb

Senior career*
Years	Team	Apps	(Gls)
1960–1970	Dinamo Zagreb	191	(31)
1970–1972	Beerschot VAV	32	(1)
Total		223	(32)

International career
1963–1969	Yugoslavia	29	(6)

Managerial career
- 1977–1978: Dinamo Zagreb
- 1983: Dinamo Zagreb
- 1989: Dinamo Zagreb
- 1998: Toronto Croatia
- 2001–2002: Iraq
Medal record
Men's football
Representing Yugoslavia
Silver medal – second place	UEFA Euro	1968
- * Club domestic league appearances and goals

Rudolf "Rudi" Belin (4 November 1942 – 3 November 2025) was a Yugoslav and Croatian football manager and player. Belin spent most of his playing career with his hometown club Dinamo Zagreb in the 1960s, with whom he won three Marshal Tito Cups and reached two Inter-Cities Fairs Cup finals. With Yugoslavia he played at the 1964 Summer Olympics in Tokyo and was part of the squad that won silver at UEFA Euro 1968. His older brother Bruno was also an accomplished footballer.

== Club career ==
Belin started his career at a small local club Jedinstvo Zagreb, and joined Dinamo Zagreb in 1959. His league debut for the club came on 21 May 1961 in an Eternal Derby match against Hajduk Split, under manager Márton Bukovi, which was his only appearance in the 1960–61 season. By the 1962–63 season, Belin established himself as part of the starting lineup under coach Milan Antolković as a right back or defensive midfielder. With Dinamo he reached the 1963 Inter-Cities Fairs Cup final in June 1963, which they lost to Spanish side Valencia 4–1 on aggregate, only a month after winning the 1962–63 Yugoslav Cup by beating Hajduk Split in the final.

In May 1964 he reached his second cup final with Dinamo, in which they were defeated by Red Star, and later that year he was voted Dinamo Player of the Year, ahead of the club's prolific goalscorer Slaven Zambata. Belin then helped Dinamo reach the 1964–65 European Cup Winners' Cup quarterfinal in March 1965, in which they were knocked out by Torino, and in May that year another Marshal Tito's Cup win followed.

Between March 1966 and the spring of 1967, Belin was away from the team serving his compulsory military service and returned to join the squad just in time for the 1967 Inter-Cities Fairs Cup quarterfinal against Juventus. Belin scored a free kick at Maksimir in Dinamo's 3–0 win, and was also a decisive player in the semi-final, as he scored an extra time penalty against Eintracht Frankfurt to edge the German side 4–3 on aggregate, in one of the biggest turnarounds in the competition's history.

He went on to be a key player in the 1967 Inter-Cities Fairs Cup final, in which Dinamo triumphed over Leeds United led by Don Revie 2–0 on aggregate. It was the first and only European trophy won by any Yugoslav club until Red Star Belgrade's 1991 European Cup win 24 years later. After that, Belin helped Dinamo to a third national cup in the 1968–69 season.

Belin went on to make 410 appearances across all competitions for Dinamo, and his last league appearance was on 28 June 1970, the last match day of the 1969–70 season, in a home defeat against NK Maribor. He then moved abroad to join Beerschot VAV in Belgium where he spent two more seasons under coach András Béres. During his time with Beerschot, he helped the club win the 1970–71 Belgian Cup, although Belin did not play beyond the quarter-final stage. He finally retired from active football after the 1971–72 season.

In total, he appeared in 46 European matches over the course of his career, including 24 in the Inter-Cities Fairs Cup and 19 in the Cup Winners' Cup for Dinamo.

He was voted Croatia's 36th footballer of the century in a 2000 poll by the Večernji List daily.

== International career ==
Belin was capped seven times for Yugoslavia youth teams between 1960 and 1963. His full international debut for Yugoslavia came in October 1963 in a friendly match against Romania in Bucharest, under co-managers Ljubomir Lovrić and Hugo Ruševljanin, where he was named in the starting eleven along with two other Dinamo debutants, Zdenko Kobešćak and Stjepan Lamza.

Belin played in all five of Yugoslavia's matches at the 1964 Olympics football tournament in Japan, where the team reached the quarter-finals. He went on to earn a total of 29 caps, scoring six goals, for Yugoslavia, and was part of the squad at the 1968 European Championship which lost the final to hosts Italy.

His final international appearance was a 1970 World Cup qualifier played in October 1969 against Belgium in Skopje, under manager Rajko Mitić.

== Managerial career ==
After retirement, Belin studied in physical education at the University of Zagreb and went into coaching. He spent a number of years as a youth coach at Dinamo Zagreb, and had three spells managing the senior team, in the 1977–78 season, in August-September 1983, and in the spring of 1989. In 1998, he also briefly managed Toronto Croatia in the Canadian Professional Soccer League, a club founded by Croatian emigrants in Canada.

Belin also had a spell coaching the Iraq national team for several matches in the 2002 World Cup qualifiers in late 2001. These notably included a 2–1 defeat against regional arch-rivals Iran managed at the time by another Dinamo Zagreb legend Miroslav Blažević.

== Death ==
Belin died in Zagreb on 3 November 2025, one day before his 83rd birthday.

== Honours ==
Dinamo Zagreb

- Marshal Tito Cup: 1962–63, 1964–65, 1968–69; runner-up 1963–64
- Inter-Cities Fairs Cup: 1966–67; runner-up 1962–63
- Yugoslav First Federal League runner-up: 1962–63, 1965–66, 1966–67, 1968–69

Beerschot VAV

- Belgian Cup: 1970–71

Yugoslavia

- Olympics Football Tournament sixth place: 1964
- UEFA European Championship runner-up: 1968
