= Zdenko Kobeščak =

Croatian footballer

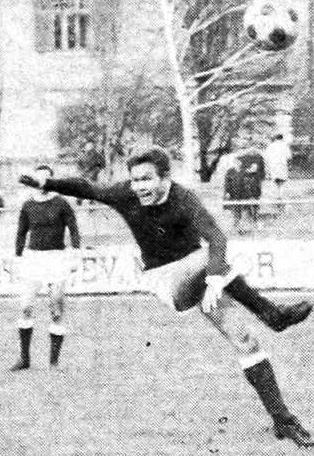

Personal information
- Date of birth: 3 December 1943 (age 82)
- Place of birth: Zagreb, Croatia
- Position: Midfielder

Youth career
- 1957–1962: Dinamo Zagreb

Senior career*
Years	Team	Apps	(Gls)
1962–1967	Dinamo Zagreb	86	(16)
1967	NK Zagreb	3	(0)
1968–1971	Maribor	74	(7)
1971–1972	Rennes	20	(2)
1972–1973	ÉDS Montluçon	7	(1)

International career
1963–1964	Yugoslavia	2	(0)

Managerial career
- 1985: Dinamo Zagreb
- 1991–1992: Dinamo Zagreb
- * Club domestic league appearances and goals

Zdenko Kobeščak (born 3 December 1943) is a Croatian retired football player. He earned two caps for Yugoslavia in the 1960s.

== Playing career ==
=== Club ===
Kobeščak made his official debut for Dinamo Zagreb in August 1962 against Partizan Belgrade, but his career at Dinamo was hampered by injuries. He played in both legs of the lost 1963 Inter-Cities Fairs Cup Final against Valencia but did not feature in Dinamo's 1967 Fairs Cup win. He played a total of 191 games for the club.

=== International ===
He made his debut for Yugoslavia in an October 1963 friendly match away against Romania and earned a total of 2 caps, scoring no goals. His second and final international was a November 1964 friendly against the Soviet Union.

== Managerial career ==
He was an assistant coach to Mirko Jozić at the 1990 UEFA European Under-16 Championship.
