= Vinko Cuzzi =

Croatian footballer

Personal information
- Full name: Vinko Cuzzi
- Date of birth: 11 July 1940
- Place of birth: Split, Kingdom of Yugoslavia
- Date of death: 8 December 2011 (aged 71)
- Place of death: Zagreb, Croatia
- Position: Defender

Senior career*
Years	Team	Apps	(Gls)
1958–1968	Hajduk Split	177	(0)
1968	Lausanne-Sport		
1969	Hajduk Split	12	(0)

International career
1965–1966	Yugoslavia	8	(0)
- * Club domestic league appearances and goals

Vinko Cuzzi (11 July 1940 – 8 December 2011) was a Croatian footballer who played as right back or libero.

== Playing career ==
=== Club ===
Cuzzi was the Hajduk Split squad captain for several years, receiving the trophy when Hajduk won the 1967 Yugoslav Cup, which was also their first triumph in that competition.

=== International ===
He made his debut for Yugoslavia in a September 1965 friendly match away against the Soviet Union and earned a total of 8 caps, scoring no goals. His final international was a June 1966 friendly away against West Germany.

== Post-playing career ==
After his playing career, he worked as a lawyer and later as a judge in the county court of Split. He was also a long time member of Hajduk's executive board as well as the president of its assembly from 1994 to 1996.

== Personal life ==
His son Ivo Cuzzi was also a footballer.

== Honours ==
Hajduk Split

- Yugoslav Cup: 1966–67
