= Rudolf Cvek =

Croatian footballer (1946–2005)

Personal information
- Date of birth: 17 October 1946
- Place of birth: Novi Marof, SFR Yugoslavia
- Date of death: 27 November 2005 (aged 59)
- Place of death: Zagreb, Croatia
- Position: Defender

Senior career*
Years	Team	Apps	(Gls)
- Varteks
1965–1970	Dinamo Zagreb	112	(1)

International career
1968–1969	Yugoslavia	6	(0)
- * Club domestic league appearances and goals

Rudolf Cvek (17 October 1946 – 27 November 2005) was a Croatian football player.

== Club career ==
A native of Novi Marof in Varaždin County, Cvek first started playing at the local side NK Varteks before moving to NK Dinamo Zagreb in 1965. In the following five seasons between 1965 and 1970 Cvek appeared in 112 Yugoslav First League matches for the Blues and helped them win the 1969 Yugoslav Cup and the 1966–67 Inter-Cities Fairs Cup, the greatest achievement in club's history (although he did not appear in the final against Leeds United).

His career was cut short by a meniscus injury he picked up in the 1969–70 European Cup Winners' Cup quarter-final away match against Schalke 04, from which he never fully recovered and which forced the talented defender to retire in 1970 at just 24 years of age.

== International career ==
Cvek was also capped six times for Yugoslavia. Called up by manager Rajko Mitić, he had his international debut in a 1970 World Cup qualifier against Finland on 25 September 1968, a 9–1 win in which his Dinamo teammate Slaven Zambata scored a hat-trick. His last international match was a friendly against Sweden five months later on 26 February 1969 in Split.

== Honours ==
- Yugoslav Cup:
  - Winner (1): 1969
  - Runner-up (1): 1966
- Yugoslav First League:
  - Runner-up (3): 1965–66, 1966–67, 1968–69
- Inter-Cities Fairs Cup:
  - Winner (1): 1966–67
