= Marijan Brnčić =

Croatian footballer

Personal information
- Date of birth: 23 July 1940 (age 86)
- Place of birth: Tribalj near Crikvenica, Kingdom of Yugoslavia
- Height: 1.82 m (6 ft 0 in)
- Position: Defender

Youth career
- NK Crikvenica
- NK Kvarner

Senior career*
Years	Team	Apps	(Gls)
1959–1964	Rijeka	199	(4)
1964–1966	Trešnjevka	55	(1)
1966–1969	Dinamo Zagreb	49	(3)
1969–1972	Waregem	83	(0)
1972–1973	Dinamo Zagreb	11	(0)
1973–1976	Kortrijk	81	(0)
Total		478	(8)

International career
1962–1967	Yugoslavia	10	(0)
1964	Yugoslavia Olympic	1	(0)

Managerial career
- 1977–1978: Kortrijk
- 1979: Rijeka (interim)
- 1981–1983: Rijeka
- 1983–1984: NK Zagreb
- 1985–1986: GOŠK-Jug
- 1987–1989: Orijent
- 1989–1990: Tunisia
- 1994–2001: Croatia Futsal
- 2005: Croatia U21 (caretaker)
- * Club domestic league appearances and goals

Marijan Brnčić (born 23 July 1940) is a former Croatian football player.

== Club career ==
He played as a centre back and central defensive midfielder but he was mostly deployed at left back. With Dinamo Zagreb he won 1966–67 Inter-Cities Fairs Cup. Brnčić was hailed as a player that could be put in any position in defense.

== International career ==
Brnčić made his debut for Yugoslavia in a September 1962 friendly match against Ethiopia, coming on as a 75th-minute substitute for Vlatko Marković, and earned a total of 10 caps scoring no goals. His final international was an October 1967 European Championship qualification match against West Germany.

He competed for Yugoslavia at the 1964 Summer Olympics.

== Club statistics ==
Club performance			League		Cup		Continental		Total	
Season	Club	League	Apps	Goals	Apps	Goals	Apps	Goals	Apps	Goals
Yugoslavia			League		Yugoslav Cup		Europe		Total	
1959–60	NK Rijeka	Yugoslav First League	19	0	0	0	–		19	0
1960–61	NK Rijeka	Yugoslav First League	17	1	1	0	–		18	1
1961–62	NK Rijeka	Yugoslav First League	17	0	2	0	–		20	0
1962–63	NK Rijeka	Yugoslav First League	22	0	1	0	8	0	31	0
1963–64	NK Rijeka	Yugoslav First League	20	0	1	0	–		21	0
1964–65	NK Trešnjevka	Yugoslav First League	26	0	2	0	–		26	0
1965–66	NK Trešnjevka	Yugoslav First League	29	1	0	0	–		29	0
1966–67	NK Dinamo Zagreb	Yugoslav First League	29	2	4	0	13	0	46	2
1967–68	NK Dinamo Zagreb	Yugoslav First League	5	0	0	0	1	0	6	0
1968–69	NK Dinamo Zagreb	Yugoslav First League	15	0	4	0	–		19	0
Belgium			League		Belgian Cup		Europe		Total	
1969–70	K.S.V. Waregem	Belgian First Division	29	0	–		–		29	0
1970–71	K.S.V. Waregem	Belgian First Division	28	0	–		–		28	0
1971–72	K.S.V. Waregem	Belgian First Division	26	0	–		–		26	0
Yugoslavia			League		Yugoslav Cup		Europe		Total	
1972–73	NK Dinamo Zagreb	Yugoslav First League	11	0	0	0	2	0	13	0
Belgium			League		Belgian Cup		Europe		Total	
1973–74	K.V. Kortrijk	Belgian Second Division	29	0	–		–		29	0
1974–75	K.V. Kortrijk	Belgian Second Division	25	0	–		–		25	0
1975–76	K.V. Kortrijk	Belgian Second Division	27	0	–		–		27	0
Country	Yugoslavia		210	4	15	0	24	0	249	4
Country	Belgium		164	0	0	0	0	0	164	0
Country	Total		374	4	15	0	24	0	413	4

== Managerial statistics ==
As of 3 May 2018

=== Club ===
Club	From	To	Competition	Record				
Club	From	To	Competition	P	W	D	L	Win %
K.V. Kortrijk	17 August 1977	10 March 1978	First Division	27	6	10	11	22.22
K.V. Kortrijk	17 August 1977	10 March 1978	Belgian Cup	2	1	1	0	50.00
NK Rijeka Total				85	27	26	32	31.76
NK Rijeka	4 April 1979	17 June 1979	First League	13	5	1	7	38.46
NK Rijeka	4 April 1979	17 June 1979	Yugoslav Cup	3	2	1	0	66.67
NK Rijeka	4 April 1979	17 June 1979	Balkans Cup	3	0	1	2	0.00
NK Rijeka Total				19	7	3	9	36.84
NK Rijeka	1 March 1981	15 May 1983	First League	79	23	26	30	29.11
NK Rijeka	1 March 1981	15 May 1983	Yugoslav Cup	6	4	0	2	66.67
NK Rijeka Total				85	27	26	32	31.76
GOŠK-Jug	11 August 1985	22 June 1986	Second League (West)	34	12	8	14	35.29
GOŠK-Jug Total				34	12	8	14	35.29
NK Orijent	August 1987	June 1989	Croatian Republic League	30	13	6	11	43.33
NK Orijent	August 1987	June 1989	Inter-Republic League (West)	34	11	9	14	32.35
NK Orijent Total				64	24	15	25	37.50
Total				287	97	78	112	33.80

=== National teams ===
Team	From	To	Record				
Team	From	To	G	W	D	L	Win %
Croatia Futsal	14 March 1994	24 October 2001	47	32	3	12	68.09
Croatia U21 (caretaker)	14 December 2005	14 December 2005	1	0	1	0	0.00
Total			48	32	4	12	66.67

*Dates of first and last games under Brnčić; not dates of official appointments

== Honours ==
=== Player ===
Dinamo Zagreb

- Yugoslav Cup: 1969
- Inter-Cities Fairs Cup: 1966–67

Kortrijk

- Belgian Second Division play-offs: 1976

=== Manager ===
NK Rijeka

- Yugoslav Cup: 1979

Croatia

- Futsal Mundialito silver medal: 1994
