= Mirko Braun =

Croatian footballer

Personal information
- Date of birth: 20 August 1942
- Place of birth: Hrvatska Dubica, Croatia
- Date of death: 22 March 2004 (aged 61)
- Place of death: Zagreb, Croatia
- Position: Defender

Senior career*
Years	Team	Apps	(Gls)
1961–1968	Dinamo Zagreb	73	(2)

International career
1963	Yugoslavia	3	(0)
- * Club domestic league appearances and goals

Mirko Braun (20 August 1942 – 22 March 2004) was a Croatian association football player.

== Club career ==
Born in Hrvatska Dubica, Braun began playing as a youngster for the local club NK Una. While playing for Una in Bjelovar he was spotted by NK Dinamo Zagreb's scouts who invited the talented left back to come to Zagreb for a trial in late 1960. After impressing Dinamo's manager Márton Bukovi he signed for the Blues and quickly went on to establish himself as a regular member of the team's defensive line in the 1961–62 season.

By 1964 Braun had 57 appearances and 2 goals for the club in the Yugoslav First League and was an important member of the squad which won the 1963 Yugoslav Cup and reached the 1962–63 Inter-Cities Fairs Cup final, in which they lost to Valencia CF 4–1 on aggregate. Led by the prolific goalscorer Slaven Zambata the team also finished runners up in the 1962–63 Yugoslav First League. In December 1963 he played in Dinamo's 1963–64 European Cup Winners' Cup first round second leg win over Celtic F.C. at Maksimir Stadium – although Celtic progressed through due to the Scots' earlier 3–0 win in Glasgow.

In early 1964 Braun was seriously injured in a car accident. He then spent the entire 1964–65 and 1965–66 seasons recovering away from the pitch. He tried to return to football in the following season and even had 15 appearances in the 1966–67 Yugoslav First League, but his good form never returned. After a single league appearance in 1967–68 Braun decided to retire from the game in his mid-twenties.

== International career ==
Braun's good performances earned him a call-up for the Yugoslavia national football team and he had his international debut in a crucial 1964 European Nations' Cup qualifier against Sweden on 18 September 1963. Although Braun's club teammate Zambata scored to put Yugoslavia 1–0 up in the opening minutes, the game eventually ended in a 3–2 defeat. Nevertheless, Braun earned his second and third cap in friendlies against Romania and Czechoslovakia in October and November.
