= Filip Blašković =

Croatian footballer

Personal information
- Date of birth: 5 July 1945 (age 81)
- Place of birth: Slavonski Brod, DF Yugoslavia
- Height: 1.83 m (6 ft 0 in)
- Position: Defender

Youth career
- 1963-1965: BSK Slavonski Brod

Senior career*
Years	Team	Apps	(Gls)
1965–1976	Dinamo Zagreb	234	(3)
1976–1978	Toronto Metros-Croatia	52	(0)
1978	BSK Slavonski Brod	13	(0)
Total		286	(3)

International career
1969	Yugoslavia	1	(0)
- * Club domestic league appearances and goals

Filip Blašković (born 5 July 1945) is a Croatian retired football player.

== Club career ==
Nicknamed Šiljo, Blašković started his career with hometown club BSK Slavonski Brod and joined Dinamo Zagreb in 1966, where he formed a formidable tandem with Mladen Ramljak and won the 1967 Inter-Cities Fairs Cup.

== International career ==
He made his debut for Yugoslavia in a September 1969 friendly match against the Soviet Union, coming on as a 30th-minute substitute for Živorad Jevtić. It remained his sole international appearance.
