= Denijal Pirić =

Bosnian footballer and manager (born 1946)

Personal information
- Date of birth: 27 September 1946 (age 80)
- Place of birth: Živinice, FPR Yugoslavia
- Position: Midfielder

Youth career
- Slaven Živinice

Senior career*
Years	Team	Apps	(Gls)
1964–1972	Dinamo Zagreb	135	(10)
1972–1977	Sarajevo	68	(6)
Total		203	(16)

International career
1969–1970	Yugoslavia	6	(1)

Managerial career
- 1986–1988: Sarajevo
- 1995–1996: Sarajevo
- 2000–2001: Sarajevo
- 2003: Bosnia and Herzegovina U19
- 2008: Bosnia and Herzegovina (caretaker)
- * Club domestic league appearances and goals

Denijal Pirić (Bosnian pronunciation: [pǐːritɕ]; born 27 September 1946) is a Bosnian former professional football manager and player.

== Club career ==
Born in the small mining town of Živinice, Pirić started playing football at local side Slaven. Former Slaven manager Vlatko Konjevod then lured him to Dinamo Zagreb and played 8 years for the club. Pirić then joined Sarajevo. With Dinamo, he won two domestic cups and the 1966–67 Inter-Cities Fairs Cup, beating Don Revie's Leeds United in the final. He played over 350 matches for Dinamo in all competitions.

== International career ==
Pirić made his debut for Yugoslavia in an April 1969 World Cup qualification match away against Spain and has earned a total of 6 caps, scoring 1 goal. His final international was a November 1970 friendly game against West Germany.

== Managerial career ==
At the time a youth team coach, Pirić was given a caretaker role of the Bosnia and Herzegovina national team to take charge of a home friendly game against Azerbaijan in Zenica on 1 June 2008 after the sacking of Meho Kodro. Most players for this match were assembled from the Bosnian Premier League.

Pirić worked as a technical director of the Bosnian national teams until his retirement in November 2017.

== Managerial statistics ==
Managerial record by team and tenure
Team	From	To	Record				
Team	From	To	P	W	D	L	Win %
Bosnia and Herzegovina U19	1 July 2003	11 November 2003	3	0	0	3	0.00
Bosnia and Herzegovina	18 May 2008	30 June 2008	1	1	0	0	100.00
Total			4	1	0	3	25.00

== Honours ==
=== Player ===
Dinamo Zagreb

- Yugoslav Cup: 1964–65, 1968–69
- Inter-Cities Fairs Cup: 1966–67
