= Marijan Novak =

Croatian footballer (born 1947)

Personal information
- Date of birth: 2 October 1947 (age 79)
- Place of birth: Zagreb, FPR Yugoslavia
- Position: Centre-forward

Youth career
- Trešnjevka

Senior career*
Years	Team	Apps	(Gls)
1964–1972	Dinamo Zagreb	138	(39)
1972–1973	VfR Heilbronn		
1973–1975	1860 Munich	19	(3)

International career
1967	Yugoslavia	1	(0)
1971	Yugoslavia Olympic	3	(2)
Medal record
Men's Football
Representing Yugoslavia
Mediterranean Games
Gold medal – first place	1971 Izmir	Team
- * Club domestic league appearances and goals

Marijan Novak (born 2 October 1947) is a retired Croatian football forward who is mainly known for his time at Dinamo Zagreb (1964–1972) and his contribution to the club's triumph in the 1966–67 Inter-Cities Fairs Cup.

== Club career ==
Novak spent his youth years at NK Trešnjevka, before signing for Dinamo Zagreb in 1964. He played for Dinamo until 1972 and helped the club win the Inter-Cities Fairs Cup in 1967 and the Yugoslav Cup in 1969. Although the club never won the Yugoslav First League during his time there, Dinamo finished as league runners-up three times (1966, 1967, 1969) as well as finishing as cup runners-up twice (1966 and 1972). Overall, Novak scored a total of 118 goals in 312 appearances during his time at Dinamo.

After leaving Dinamo in late 1972 he joined German second-level side VfR Heilbronn where he stayed for a single season before moving to another German second level outfit TSV 1860 München in 1973. After two seasons at Munich and only 3 goals from 19 appearances, Novak retired in 1975, aged only 28.

== International career ==
Following Dinamo's successful Inter-Cities Fairs Cup campaign, Novak was also called up and appeared for Yugoslavia in a friendly away against the Netherlands on 1 November 1967, but never appeared for the national team again.

== Honours ==
- Yugoslav Cup
  - Winner (1): 1969
  - Runner-up (1): 1966, 1972
- Yugoslav First League
  - Runner-up (1): 1966, 1967, 1969
- Inter-Cities Fairs Cup
  - Winner (1): 1967
