= 1968–69 Yugoslav First League =

Football league season

Prva savezna liga
- Season: 1968–69
- Dates: 18 August 1968 – 7 July 1969
- Champions: Red Star (9th title)
- Relegated: Rijeka; Proleter Zrenjanin
- European Cup: Red Star
- Cup Winners' Cup: Dinamo Zagreb
- Inter-Cities Fairs Cup: Partizan; Vojvodina; NK Zagreb
- Top goalscorer: Vojin Lazarević (22)

The 1968–69 Yugoslav First League season was the 23rd season of the First Federal League (Serbo-Croatian: Prva savezna liga), the top level association football league of SFR Yugoslavia, since its establishment in 1946. Eighteen teams contested the competition, with Red Star winning their ninth national title.

== Teams ==
Due to the expansion of the format from 16 to 18 teams at the end of the previous season no one was relegated. Bor and Čelik were promoted from the 1967–68 Yugoslav Second League.

Team	Location	Federal Republic	Position in 1967–68
Bor	Bor	SR Serbia	—
Čelik	Zenica	SR Bosnia and Herzegovina	—
Dinamo Zagreb	Zagreb	SR Croatia	3rd
Hajduk Split	Split	SR Croatia	4th
Maribor	Maribor	SR Slovenia	12th
OFK Belgrade	Belgrade	SR Serbia	15th
Olimpija	Ljubljana	SR Slovenia	11th
Partizan	Belgrade	SR Serbia	2nd
Proleter Zrenjanin	Zrenjanin	SR Serbia	8th
Radnički Niš	Niš	SR Serbia	9th
Red Star	Belgrade	SR Serbia	1st
Rijeka	Rijeka	SR Croatia	16th
Sarajevo	Sarajevo	SR Bosnia and Herzegovina	7th
Vardar	Skopje	SR Macedonia	6th
Velež	Mostar	SR Bosnia and Herzegovina	14th
Vojvodina	Novi Sad	SR Serbia	13th
NK Zagreb	Zagreb	SR Croatia	10th
Željezničar	Sarajevo	SR Bosnia and Herzegovina	5th

== League table ==
Pos	Team	Pld	W	D	L	GF	GA	GD	Pts	Qualification or relegation
1	Red Star Belgrade (C)	34	18	12	4	75	30	+45	48	Qualification for European Cup first round
2	Dinamo Zagreb	34	20	5	9	75	33	+42	45	Qualification for Cup Winners' Cup first round
3	Partizan	34	13	14	7	55	40	+15	40	Invitation for Inter-Cities Fairs Cup first round
4	Vojvodina	34	15	9	10	42	44	−2	39	Invitation for Inter-Cities Fairs Cup first round
5	Željezničar	34	15	8	11	51	38	+13	38	
6	Hajduk Split	34	11	16	7	47	38	+9	38	
7	Radnički Niš	34	12	10	12	35	36	−1	34	
8	Velež	34	9	16	9	41	45	−4	34	
9	Čelik	34	11	11	12	42	41	+1	33	
10	Vardar	34	12	9	13	37	36	+1	33	
11	Sarajevo	34	10	13	11	38	44	−6	33	
12	Olimpija	34	11	11	12	32	41	−9	33	
13	Bor	34	9	13	12	35	46	−11	31	
14	OFK Belgrade	34	13	4	17	43	52	−9	30	
15	NK Zagreb	34	11	7	16	41	59	−18	29	Invitation for Inter-Cities Fairs Cup first round
16	Maribor	34	7	14	13	33	57	−24	28	
17	Rijeka (R)	34	9	5	20	31	52	−21	23	Relegation to Yugoslav Second League
18	Proleter Zrenjanin (R)	34	7	9	18	24	45	−21	23	Relegation to Yugoslav Second League

Source: rsssf.org
Rules for classification: 1) points; 2) goal difference; 3) number of goals scored.
(C) Champions; (R) Relegated

== Results ==
Home \ Away	BOR	ČEL	DIN	HAJ	MAR	OFK	OLI	PAR	PRO	RNI	RSB	RIJ	SAR	VAR	VEL	VOJ	ZAG	ŽEL
Bor		1–1	0–2	1–1	4–0	2–4	0–0	1–1	1–0	2–0	1–4	2–1	0–0	1–0	0–0	1–0	2–1	2–2
Čelik	1–1		2–0	3–3	1–1	1–0	2–0	0–0	0–0	3–1	1–1	2–1	2–1	2–0	6–0	2–0	1–1	2–0
Dinamo Zagreb	4–0	4–0		2–2	3–0	0–3	1–1	3–0	3–2	3–0	2–0	3–0	6–1	4–0	2–0	6–1	1–0	1–0
Hajduk Split	3–1	1–0	2–1		2–0	2–0	1–2	1–1	1–1	2–1	1–1	3–0	2–0	2–1	1–1	0–0	3–2	2–1
Maribor	3–1	2–1	1–4	0–0		3–0	2–2	4–1	2–0	1–1	1–1	0–3	1–1	1–0	2–2	0–0	0–0	0–0
OFK Belgrade	4–3	1–3	2–3	1–1	2–0		1–0	0–5	2–0	0–2	0–2	5–1	2–0	0–0	1–3	1–1	4–1	2–1
Olimpija	1–1	1–0	0–0	2–1	4–1	2–0		1–1	0–0	2–1	0–1	3–0	0–0	1–0	2–3	0–0	0–2	0–3
Partizan	3–0	4–1	0–2	2–1	4–1	1–2	0–0		4–1	1–1	2–2	2–0	1–1	1–1	2–0	5–0	3–0	2–1
Proleter Zrenjanin	0–1	1–0	1–0	1–1	1–2	0–1	2–0	0–0		2–0	0–0	0–0	1–0	0–1	1–4	1–0	3–3	4–1
Radnički Niš	0–0	0–0	3–1	0–0	0–0	2–0	0–0	3–1	3–1		2–1	1–0	3–0	1–0	1–1	2–0	1–2	2–1
Red Star	2–0	3–1	1–3	3–3	8–1	2–0	6–0	6–1	2–0	2–0		2–1	1–2	3–0	1–1	3–0	3–0	1–1
Rijeka	2–0	1–0	3–1	0–0	1–1	1–2	0–1	3–0	3–0	0–1	0–2		1–1	1–0	1–0	2–2	0–1	2–0
Sarajevo	1–1	4–0	3–2	0–0	1–1	2–0	2–1	0–0	2–0	0–0	1–4	2–1		0–0	1–0	2–3	4–0	0–1
Vardar	2–1	2–1	2–1	1–0	2–1	2–0	1–2	1–2	0–0	2–0	1–1	4–0	1–1		0–0	0–0	5–1	3–1
Velež	0–0	1–1	1–1	2–1	1–0	2–1	4–1	1–1	1–0	2–2	1–1	4–1	1–1	1–1		2–2	0–2	0–0
Vojvodina	1–4	1–0	1–0	2–1	3–0	1–1	2–0	1–1	1–0	3–0	0–2	2–0	5–2	2–1	4–1		1–0	1–0
NK Zagreb	2–0	2–2	0–5	1–1	1–1	2–1	1–3	1–3	3–0	1–0	1–1	2–0	1–2	1–2	2–1	0–1		2–4
Željezničar	0–0	2–0	1–1	4–2	2–0	1–0	2–0	0–0	3–1	2–1	2–2	3–1	2–0	3–1	2–0	4–1	1–2	

Source: DataSoccer.it
Legend: Blue = home team win; Yellow = draw; Red = away team win.

== Top scorers ==
Rank	Player	Club	Goals
1	(Socialist Federal Republic of Yugoslavia) Vojin Lazarević	Red Star	22
2	(Socialist Federal Republic of Yugoslavia) Dušan Bajević	Velež	18
3	(Socialist Federal Republic of Yugoslavia) Stevan Ostojić	Red Star	17
4	(Socialist Federal Republic of Yugoslavia) Dragan Džajić	Red Star	16
4	(Socialist Federal Republic of Yugoslavia) Slaven Zambata	Dinamo Zagreb	16
6	(Socialist Federal Republic of Yugoslavia) Fikret Mujkić	Željezničar	14
6	(Socialist Federal Republic of Yugoslavia) Nenad Cvetković	Radnički Niš	14
8	(Socialist Federal Republic of Yugoslavia) Edin Sprečo	Željeznicar	12
8	(Socialist Federal Republic of Yugoslavia) Rudolf Belin	Dinamo Zagreb	12
10	(Socialist Federal Republic of Yugoslavia) Petar Nadoveza	Hajduk Split	10

== See also ==
- 1968–69 Yugoslav Second League
- 1968–69 Yugoslav Cup
