= Marijan Čerček =

Croatian footballer (1949–2025)

Personal information
- Date of birth: 3 February 1949
- Place of birth: Zagreb, PR Croatia, FPR Yugoslavia
- Date of death: 31 December 2025 (aged 76)
- Place of death: Zagreb, Croatia
- Position: Midfielder

Senior career*
Years	Team	Apps	(Gls)
1967–1975	Dinamo Zagreb	182	(25)
1975–1981	NK Zagreb	172	(35)
Total		354	(60)

International career
1969	Yugoslavia	1	(0)
- * Club domestic league appearances and goals

Marijan Čerček (3 February 1949 – 31 December 2025) was a Croatian footballer who played as a midfielder.

== Career ==
Čerček scored the 1–0 goal in the first leg of the Inter-Cities Fairs Cup against Leeds United.

He made his debut for Yugoslavia in a September 1969 friendly match against the Soviet Union, it remained his sole international appearance.

== Death ==
Čerček died in Zagreb on 31 December 2025 at the age of 76.
