= Josip Gucmirtl =

Croatian footballer (1942–2009)

Personal information
- Date of birth: 16 March 1942
- Place of birth: Osijek, Independent State of Croatia
- Date of death: 24 November 2009 (aged 67)
- Place of death: Zagreb, Croatia
- Position: Forward

Senior career*
Years	Team	Apps	(Gls)
- Osijek
1965–1973	Dinamo Zagreb	191	(54)
1973-1975	Basel		
- * Club domestic league appearances and goals

Josip Gucmirtl (16 March 1942 – 24 November 2009) was a Croatian football player. Gucmirtl first started playing for his hometown club NK Osijek before coming to Croatian powerhouse Dinamo Zagreb in 1965. Gucmirtl played as a striker for Dinamo throughout the remainder of his career, appearing in a total of 409 matches and scoring 109 goals for the Blues (including 191 appearances and 54 goals in the Yugoslav First League). He is mainly remembered for being a member of Dinamo's Golden Generation which won the 1966–67 Inter-Cities Fairs Cup, the club's only European silverware in history.

== Club career ==
He debuted for Dinamo on 7 February 1965 in an Eternal Derby game against Hajduk Split at Maksimir, and his last match for Dinamo was on 25 June 1973 against Red Star Belgrade. Apart from the Inter-Cities Fairs Cup, Gucmirtl also won the 1969 Yugoslav Cup with Dinamo.
