= Branko Gračanin =

Croatian footballer

Personal information
- Date of birth: 19 October 1943 (age 83)
- Place of birth: Zagreb, Croatia
- Position: Defender

Senior career*
Years	Team	Apps	(Gls)
1963–1965	Trešnjevka	36	(0)
1965–1972	Dinamo Zagreb	156	(0)
1972–1974	Istres Sports		
1974–1975	FC Mulhouse		
1975–1978	Saint-Dié	43	(2)

International career
1968–1970	Yugoslavia	10	(1)
- * Club domestic league appearances and goals

Branko Gračanin (born 19 October 1943 in Zagreb, Kingdom of Yugoslavia) is a Croatian retired football player.

== International career ==
He made his debut for Yugoslavia in a December 1968 friendly match away against Brazil and earned a total of 10 caps, scoring 1 goal. His final international was an April 1970 friendly against Hungary.
