= Zlatko Škorić =

Croatian footballer (1941–2019)

Personal information
- Date of birth: 27 July 1941
- Place of birth: Zagreb, Independent State of Croatia
- Date of death: 23 May 2019 (aged 77)
- Place of death: Zagreb, Croatia
- Position: Goalkeeper

Youth career
- Elektrostroj Zagreb

Senior career*
Years	Team	Apps	(Gls)
1960–1969	Dinamo Zagreb	150	(0)
1969	Avignon	9	(0)
1969–1971	Olimpija Ljubljana	51	(1)
1971–1972	VfB Stuttgart	24	(0)
1972–1973	Bayern Munich	0	(0)
1973–1975	Avignon	63	(0)
1975–1976	NK Zagreb	26	(0)
Total		323	(1)

International career
1964–1966	Yugoslavia	8	(0)

Managerial career
- BSK Slavonski Brod
- Angola
- Samobor
- Segesta
- 1984-1985: Dinamo Zagreb (gk coach)
- * Club domestic league appearances and goals

Zlatko Škorić (27 July 1941 – 23 May 2019) was a Yugoslav and Croatian football goalkeeper. He got eight caps for the Yugoslavia national team.

== Club career ==
He played a total of 221 matches for Dinamo Zagreb and he won the Inter-Cities Fairs Cup in 1967 with them as well as four Yugoslav Cups: in 1960, 1963, 1965 and 1969.

== International career ==
Škorić made his debut for Yugoslavia in an April 1964 friendly match against Bulgaria and earned a total of 8 caps, scoring no goals. His final international was a May 1966 friendly against Hungary.

== Death ==
He died in May 2019.
