= Stjepan Lamza =

Croatian footballer (1940–2022)

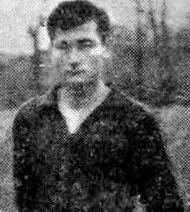
- Stjepan Lamza in 1961

Personal information
- Date of birth: 23 January 1940
- Place of birth: Sisak, Yugoslavia
- Date of death: 12 January 2022 (aged 81)
- Position: Midfielder

Senior career*
Years	Team	Apps	(Gls)
1956–?	Segesta		
?–1960	Branik Maribor		
1960–1967	Dinamo Zagreb	127	(18)
1968–1969	Rijeka	3	(0)
1969–1970	NK Zagreb	6	(2)
1970–1971	Châteauroux	9	(1)
1972	Croatia Melbourne		

International career
1963–1967	Yugoslavia	7	(0)
- * Club domestic league appearances and goals

Stjepan Lamza (23 January 1940 – 12 January 2022) was a Croatian footballer who played as a midfielder. He is considered one of the greatest Croatian players of all time and played for much of his career for Dinamo Zagreb, whom he helped in winning the Inter-Cities Fairs Cup in 1967. He made seven appearances for Yugoslavia national team.

== Club career ==
Lamza started his career in his hometown Sisak where he played for a local club Segesta and later transferred to a Slovenian club Branik Maribor. It was in Branik when his talent was spotted by, then Yugoslav giants, Dinamo Zagreb and he soon moved there.

It was in Zagreb where Lamza made his name and he played a total of 281 games for the blues, scoring 72 goals in the process. He is considered one of the greatest Croatian football players of all time and a leader of Dinamo's golden generation that won the Inter-Cities Fairs Cup in 1967 and was runner-up four years earlier in 1963. It was in 1967 and the age of only 27 when his career made a dramatic twist as Lamza was involved in an accident that prevented him in reaching football greatness. After the 1967 Inter-Cities Fairs Cup semifinal against Eintracht Frankfurt, when Dinamo managed to overturn their first leg defeat in Germany (3–0) with a home victory (4–0) after extra time, he and his teammates went on to celebrate the victory to a luxury restaurant, that lasted late into the night. The next morning Lamza woke up early in the morning in one of the rooms upstairs and found a bar in the lobby below that was empty and started drinking. When other teammates and guest started to wake up they found Lamza drunk in the lobby and one of Dinamo's officials (Karlo Žagar) ordered the waitress to take him back to his room so others would not see him in the state he was in. She has done just that and took Lamza to his bed and then locked the door of the room. Later, when Lamza woke up, he was still intoxicated and found the doors locked and went into the balcony where he fell down, hitting the chair with his shoulder and a concrete floor with the right side of his head. He was immediately rushed to a hospital where he stayed for 40 days and was diagnosed with a severe head fracture and most importantly the damage to his nerve center that hurt his center of balance, which subsequently affected his career as Lamza never demonstrated the level of football he did prior to the accident. He followed the final of the 1967 Inter-Cities Fairs Cup (won by Dinamo) by a radio broadcast from a hospital room in Bled.

It was this accident that shattered his dreams of playing top football abroad as just after the historic return leg against Eintracht and hours before the accident itself he had immediately signed a contract with Belgian club Standard Liège worth $280,000 (around 1.8 million in 2010s currency), which was a huge amount of money for a player at that time. With his accident and injuries the contract was then never carried out.

Lamza returned to football one year later but was not given a chance by the new coach of Dinamo, Ivica Horvat. He made his final appearance for Dinamo on 21 April 1970 on a farewell match, organized by the club, that was played against Benfica and their star player Eusébio. Dinamo won the match 2–0, with Lamza scoring the first goal. Later he had a couple of unsuccessful and short lived spells at clubs home and abroad (Châteauroux, Rijeka, 1860 München, Melbourne Croatia), but never fully demonstrated the level of football he did prior to the accident.

He returned to football at the beginning of the nineties as a Dinamo's scout.

== International career ==
Lamza made his debut for Yugoslavia in an October 1963 friendly match away against Romania and earned a total of only 7 caps, scoring no goals. The reason for so few caps being the accident and the supposed discrimination of Dinamo's players at the time. His final international was a May 1967 European Championship qualification match away against Albania.

== Personal life and death ==
Lamza once stated that he was probably saved when Dinamo's patronage Zdravko Mamić and head coach at the time Miroslav Blažević offered him to work for the club, at the beginning of the nineties, as he had only around €200 of pension from which he did not know how he would have been able to survive. He stated that he saw Luka Modrić as his successor due to his similar style of playing and physique.

Luka Modrić reminds me of me. He is fast without the ball as I was. When I had the ball at my feet I went like a rocket, as I always knew where I want to go with it.

— Stjepan Lamza when asked about his successor

He died on 12 January 2022, at the age of 81.

== Honours ==
Dinamo Zagreb

- Yugoslav Football Cup: 1963, 1965,
- Inter-Cities Fairs Cup: 1966–67
