= Mladen Ramljak =

Croatian footballer

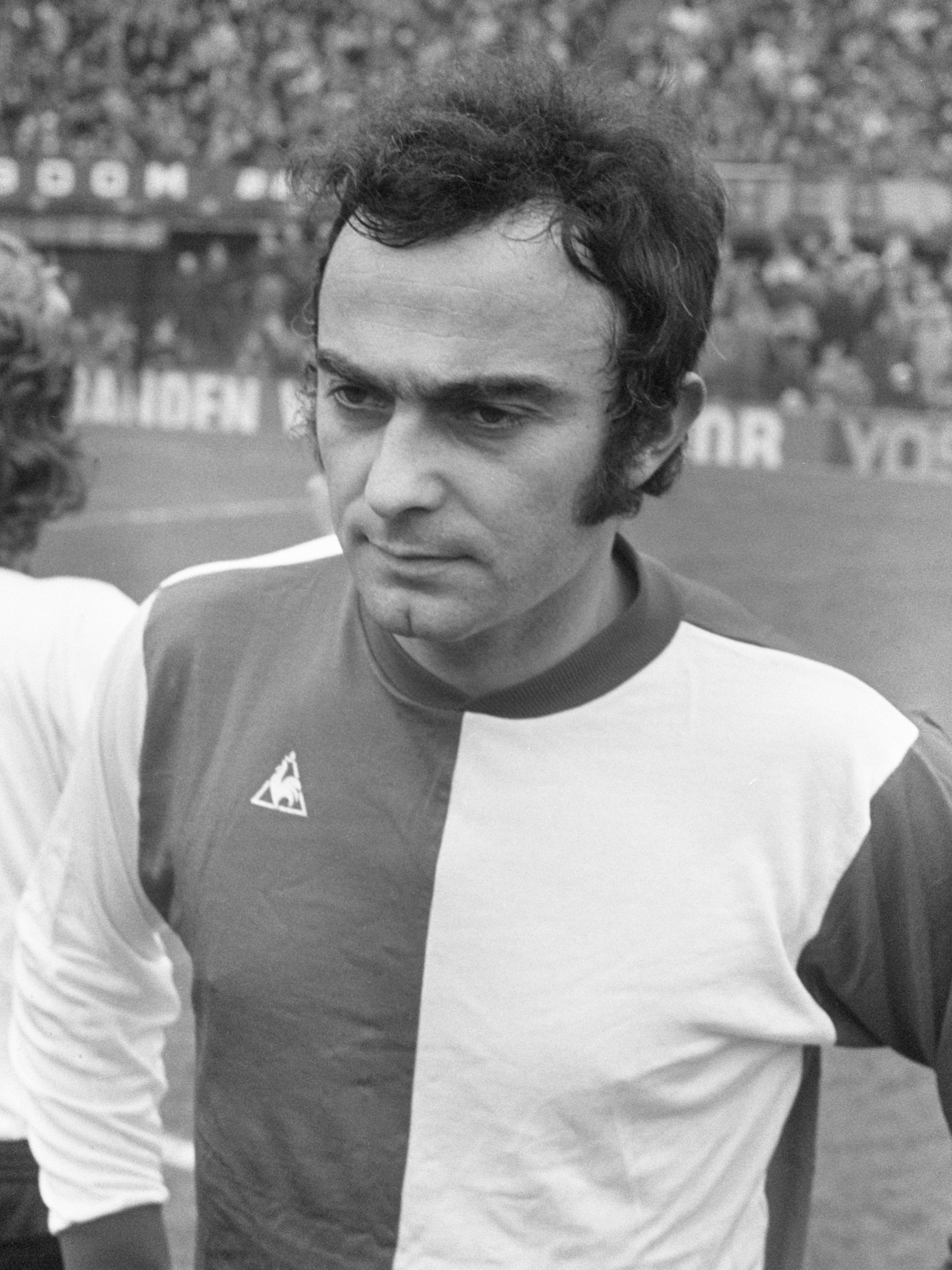
- Ramljak lining up for Feyenoord before an Eredivisie match versus NAC in December 1973.

Personal information
- Date of birth: 1 July 1945
- Place of birth: Zagreb, FS Croatia, DF Yugoslavia
- Date of death: 13 September 1978 (aged 33)
- Place of death: Novska, SR Croatia, SFR Yugoslavia
- Position: Defender

Senior career*
Years	Team	Apps	(Gls)
1962–1973	Dinamo Zagreb	263	(4)
1974–1977	Feyenoord	68	(1)
1977–1978	AZ '67	0	(0)
Total		331	(5)

International career
1966–1972	Yugoslavia	13	(0)
Medal record
Men's Football
Representing Yugoslavia
European Championship
Silver medal – second place	1968 Italy	Team
- * Club domestic league appearances and goals

Mladen Ramljak (1 July 1945 – 13 September 1978) was a Croatian football defender.

== Club career ==
Ramljak left Dinamo Zagreb for Dutch side Feyenoord after playing over 600 games for the club. He moved to AZ '67 after three seasons in Rotterdam, but never played for AZ as his career got cut short due to injury.

== International career ==
He made his debut for Yugoslavia in a May 1966 friendly match against Hungary and earned a total of 13 caps, scoring no goals. He was a participant at Euro 1968 and his final international was a May 1972 European Championship qualification match away against the Soviet Union.

== Death and legacy ==
Mladen Ramljak died in a road accident near Novska. Dinamo Zagreb holds an international memorial tournament in his honour for youth squads.
