= Slaven Zambata =

Croatian footballer (1940–2020)

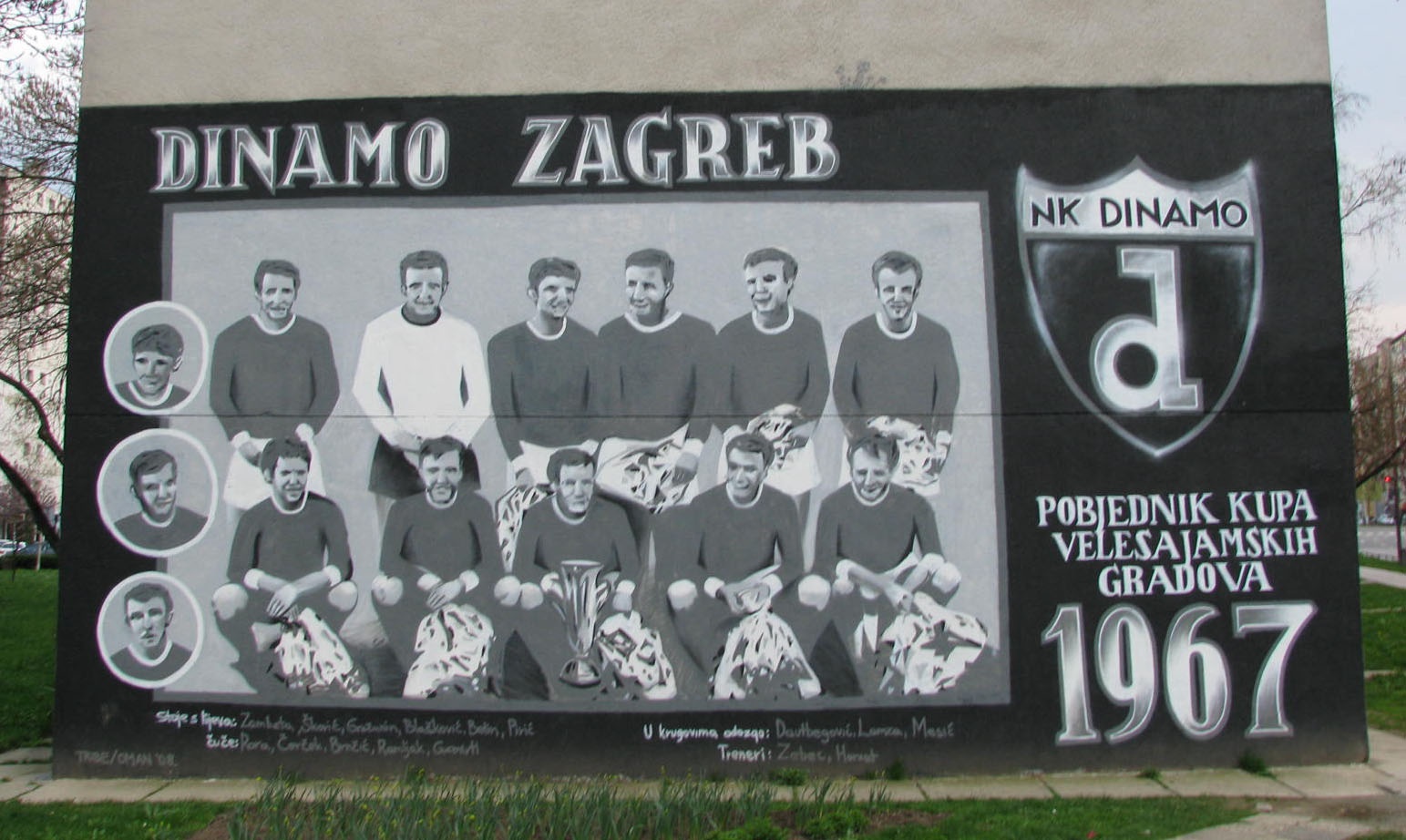

Personal information
- Date of birth: 24 September 1940
- Place of birth: Sinj, Yugoslavia (now Croatia)
- Date of death: 29 October 2020 (aged 80)
- Place of death: Zagreb, Croatia
- Position: Forward

Youth career
- Junak Sinj

Senior career*
Years	Team	Apps	(Gls)
1958–1959	Junak Sinj		
1959–1969	Dinamo Zagreb	171	(92)
1969–1971	KSV Waregem	34	(16)
1971–1972	Crossing Club	23	(3)
1972–1973	Dinamo Zagreb	3	(0)
1973	WSG Radenthein		
Total		231	(111)

International career
1963	Yugoslavia U21	2	(2)
1962–1968	Yugoslavia	31	(21)
- * Club domestic league appearances and goals

Slaven Zambata (24 September 1940 – 29 October 2020) was a Croatian professional football player best known for his time at Dinamo Zagreb in the 1960s, for whom he appeared in 171 Yugoslav First League matches. He was also a Yugoslav international, scoring 21 goals in 31 matches for the national side.

== Club career ==
Zambata started playing football at his hometown club Junak Sinj and was signed by Dinamo Zagreb in 1959, at the age of eighteen. He stayed with the Croatian powerhouse until 1969, and during this time earned a total of 393 appearances and scored 267 goals (93 of which in the Yugoslav First League). He won four Yugoslav Cups with Dinamo (in 1960, 1963, 1965 and 1969) and also captained the team to their triumph in the 1966–67 Inter-Cities Fairs Cup in a campaign that saw Zambata scoring six goals. He also finished as Cup runner-up on two occasions (in 1964 and 1966) and was Inter-Cities Fairs Cup runner-up in 1963.

After leaving Dinamo in 1969 he played for a few seasons for Belgian clubs KSV Waregem and Crossing Club before returning shortly to Zagreb in 1972. He quit playing football in 1973 after a couple of serious injuries (he had surgery performed on both of his menisci just before his retirement).

As of 2009, he was still the 8th most prolific goalscorer in Dinamo's history, and one of only two players to score a hat-trick in a Yugoslav Cup final game, against Hajduk Split on 26 May 1963. Although Dinamo never won the Yugoslav league championship during his ten years with the club, they did finish as runners-up five times (1960, 1963, 1966, 1967, 1969) in one of the most successful periods in club's history.

== International career ==
Considered one of the best Yugoslav forwards of the 1960s, Zambata had two appearances and netted two goals for Yugoslavia U-21 selection, before debuting for Yugoslavia on 16 September 1962 in a friendly against East Germany in Leipzig. He went on to earn 31 caps and scored 21 goals, and during his international career he captained Yugoslavia at the 1964 Olympics in Tokyo, where they finished sixth out of 16 teams. His last international match was on 27 October 1968 against Spain in Belgrade.

== Honours ==
Dinamo Zagreb

- Marshal Tito Cup: 1962–63, 1964–65, 1968–69; runner-up 1963–64, 1965–66
- Inter-Cities Fairs Cup: 1966–67; runner-up 1962–63
- Yugoslav First Federal League runner-up:1959–60, 1962–63, 1965–66, 1966–67, 1968–69

Yugoslavia

- Olympics Football Tournament sixth place: 1964
