= 1931 Yugoslav Football Championship =

Yugoslav State Championship
- Season: 1931
- Dates: 6 September – 13 December
- Champions: BSK (1st title)
- Top goalscorer: Đorđe Vujadinović (10)

The 1931 State Championship (Serbo-Croatian: Državno prvenstvo 1931 / Државно првенство 1931) begun shortly after the previous season and was now contested during autumn and continuing through the next year ending in spring. BSK ended the Zagreb clubs' streak with record stats and an undefeated season.

Jugoslavija Beograd didn't qualify for the Državno prvenstvo.

== Teams ==
Location of teams in the 1931 Yugoslav championship

As of end of season, December 1931

Team	City	Managers	Ground
BSK	Belgrade	(Kingdom of Yugoslavia) Nikola Simić	
Concordia	Zagreb	(Austria) Erwin Puschner	
Građanski	Zagreb	(Austria) Robert Haftl	Stadion Građanskog
Hajduk	Split	(Kingdom of Yugoslavia) Luka Kaliterna	Stari plac
SAŠK	Sarajevo	(Kingdom of Yugoslavia) Nedžad Sulejmanpašić & (Austria) Viktor Götz	
Mačva	Šabac	(Austria) Otto Fischer	

Managerial changes during season

- BSK – Adolf Engel replaced by Nikola Simić

== League table ==
Pos	Team	Pld	W	D	L	GF	GA	GR	Pts
1	BSK	10	10	0	0	32	6	5.333	20
2	Concordia	10	5	1	4	24	18	1.333	11
3	Građanski	10	4	2	4	10	10	1.000	10
4	Hajduk Split	10	3	3	4	13	16	0.813	9
5	SAŠK	10	3	0	7	18	28	0.643	6
6	Mačva Šabac	10	1	2	7	8	27	0.296	4

Source: rsssf.org

== Results ==
Home \ Away	BSK	CON	GRA	HAJ	MAČ	SAŠ
BSK		2–1	2–1	4–0	3–0	4–0
Concordia	2–6		1–0	4–0	5–2	5–2
Građanski Zagreb	1–2	2–1		1–1	1–0	1–0
Hajduk Split	0–2	3–0	1–1		3–0	3–1
Mačva	1–3	0–0	1–0	1–1		2–4
SAŠK Sarajevo	0–4	1–5	1–2	2–1	7–1	

Source: DataSoccer.it
Legend: Blue = home team win; Yellow = draw; Red = away team win.

== Winning squad ==
Champions:

BSK (coach: Antal Nemes)

- Otmar Gazzari
- Predrag Radovanović
- Dragomir Tošić
- Milorad Arsenijević
- Đorđe Popović
- Miodrag Jovanović
- Ljubiša Đorđević
- Aleksandar Tirnanić
- Svetislav Glišović
- Blagoje Marjanović
- Nikola Marjanović
- Đorđe Vujadinović
- Dragoslav Virić
- Predrag Antić

== Top scorers ==
Final goalscoring position, number of goals, player/players and club.

- 10 goals – Đorđe Vujadinović (BSK)
- 7 goals – Blagoje Marjanović (BSK), Vladimir Lolić (Concordia)
- 6 goals – Aleksandar Tirnanić (BSK), Alojz Klemens (SAŠK), Mirko Kokotović (Građanski)
- 4 goals – Dragoslav Virić (BSK), Aleksandar Živković (Concordia), Leo Lemešić (Hajduk Split)

== See also ==
- Yugoslav Cup
- Yugoslav Football Championship
- Football Association of Yugoslavia
