= 1933 Yugoslav Football Championship =

11th State Championship
- Season: 1933
- Dates: 5 February – 3 December
- Champions: BSK (2nd title)
- Top goalscorer: Vladimir Kragić (21)

The 1933 Yugoslav Football Championship (Serbo-Croato-Slovenian: Državno prvenstvo 1933 / Државно првенство 1933) was the 11th season of Kingdom of Yugoslavia's premier football competition.

== Teams ==
Location of teams in the 1938–39 Yugoslav championship

As of end of season in December 1933

Team	City	Managers	Ground
BSK	Belgrade	(Hungary) Sándor Nemes	
Hajduk	Split	(Kingdom of Yugoslavia) Luka Kaliterna	Stari plac
HAŠK	Zagreb	(Kingdom of Yugoslavia) Ivan Babić	Stadion HAŠK
BASK	Belgrade	(Kingdom of Yugoslavia) Sima Simić	
SK Jugoslavija	Belgrade	(Kingdom of Yugoslavia) Dragan Jovanović	Stadion Jugoslavije
Građanski	Zagreb	(Republic of Ireland) James Donnelly	Stadion Građanskog
HŠK Concordia	Zagreb	(Austria) Erwin Puschner	Stadion Concordije
ASK Primorje	Ljubljana	(Kingdom of Yugoslavia) Nedeljko Buljević	Stadion ob Tyrševi cesti
Slavija	Sarajevo	(Kingdom of Yugoslavia) Risto Šošić	
Slavija	Osijek	(Kingdom of Yugoslavia) Ljubomir Kniffer	
Vojvodina	Novi Sad	(Hungary) Károly Nemes	

Managerial changes during season

- HAŠK – Johann Strnad replaced by Ivan Babić
- Građanski – György Molnár replaced by James Donnelly

== League table ==
Pos	Team	Pld	W	D	L	GF	GA	GR	Pts
1	BSK	20	14	3	3	66	21	3.143	31
2	Hajduk Split	20	13	2	5	41	19	2.158	28
3	SK Jugoslavija	20	10	3	7	34	27	1.259	23
4	HAŠK	20	10	3	7	37	33	1.121	23
5	BASK	20	10	3	7	42	37	1.135	23
6	Građanski Zagreb	20	10	1	9	32	32	1.000	21
7	Concordia Zagreb	20	7	4	9	39	40	0.975	18
8	Primorje	20	7	3	10	39	47	0.830	17
9	Slavija Sarajevo	20	7	2	11	37	48	0.771	16
10	Slavija Osijek	20	4	2	14	22	54	0.407	10
11	Vojvodina	20	3	4	13	22	53	0.415	10

Source: rsssf.org

== Results ==
Home \ Away	BAS	BSK	CON	GRA	HAJ	HŠK	PRI	JUG	SLO	SLS	VOJ
BASK		4–3	2–1	4–1	2–1	2–2	4–2	0–2	1–0	3–1	3–1
BSK	4–1		2–0	2–1	2–2	1–0	5–0	4–0	9–0	8–1	2–1
Concordia	2–1	0–6		1–5	1–2	1–3	5–0	3–1	4–0	1–3	5–1
Građanski Zagreb	2–0	2–3	1–0		0–2	2–0	3–2	2–4	5–1	1–0	0–0
Hajduk Split	3–1	1–1	1–0	2–0		7–1	3–0	1–0	2–0	4–1	5–0
HAŠK	3–0	4–3	3–3	0–1	1–0		2–0	0–0	6–0	2–1	7–2
Primorje	1–1	1–5	1–1	4–1	1–2	4–1		1–0	2–2	2–3	5–0
SK Jugoslavija	2–2	0–2	2–2	2–0	3–0	2–1	5–1		0–1	2–1	4–3
Slavija Osijek	4–2	2–0	3–4	1–2	2–0	1–2	1–4	0–1		0–4	2–2
Slavija Sarajevo	2–7	1–1	1–3	3–1	1–2	3–1	1–2	1–3	3–2		4–1
Vojvodina	0–2	0–3	2–2	0–2	2–1	2–3	2–6	2–1	1–0	2–2	

Source: DataSoccer.it
Legend: Blue = home team win; Yellow = draw; Red = away team win.

== Winning squad ==
Champions:

BSK (coach: Sándor Nemes)

- Franjo Glazer
- Predrag Radovanović
- Dragomir Tošić
- Milorad Arsenijević
- Ivan Stevović
- Radivoj Božić
- Ljubiša Đorđević
- Aleksandar Tirnanić
- Slavko Šurdonja
- Kuzman Sotirović
- Blagoje Marjanović
- Đorđe Vujadinović
- Svetislav Glišović

== Top scorers ==
Final goalscoring position, number of goals, player/players and club.

- 21 goals – Vladimir Kragić (Hajduk Split)
- 16 goals – Đorđe Vujadinović (BSK)
- 15 goals – Blagoje Marjanović (BSK)
- 13 goals – Ivan Medarić (HAŠK)
- 12 goals – Aleksandar Tomašević (BASK), Adolf Erman (Primorje)
- 10 goals – Slavko Šurdonja (BSK), Branislav Hrnjiček (BASK), Aleksandar Živković (Građanski)

== See also ==
- Yugoslav Cup
- Yugoslav Football Championship
- Football Association of Yugoslavia
