= 1935 Yugoslav Football Championship =

12th season of association football competition

Yugoslav State Championship
- Season: 1935
- Dates: 17 March – 15 September
- Champions: BSK (3rd title)
- Matches: 90
- Goals: 339 (3.77 per match)
- Top goalscorer: Leo Lemešić (18)

The 1935 Yugoslav Football Championship, officially called State Championship (Serbo-Croatian and Slovene: Državno prvenstvo; Serbian Cyrillic: Државно првенство) was the 12th season of the main association football competition in the Kingdom of Yugoslavia.

The championship was played in a round-robin league format over six months between March and September 1935, and featured 12 clubs based in six cities (Belgrade, Zagreb, Split, Sarajevo, Ljubljana, and Osijek).

The defending champions were BSK from the capital Belgrade, who had won their previous title in 1933. BSK, led by Austrian manager Josef Uridil, also won the 1935 edition in a closely contested title race, finishing two points in front of their cross-town rivals SK Jugoslavija and the Croatian club Građanski Zagreb.

== Teams ==
Location of teams in the 1935 Yugoslav championship

As of end of season, in September 1935

Team	City	Managers	Ground
BASK	Belgrade		
BSK	Belgrade	(Austria) Josef Uridil	
Concordia	Zagreb	(Austria) Otto Fischer	
Građanski	Zagreb	(Austria) Anton "Toni" Ringer	Stadion Građanskog
Hajduk	Split	(Kingdom of Yugoslavia) Luka Kaliterna	Stari plac
HAŠK	Zagreb	(Kingdom of Yugoslavia) Miško Zebić (Kingdom of Yugoslavia) Ivan Babić	Stadion HAŠK
SK Jugoslavija	Belgrade	(Kingdom of Yugoslavia) Branislav Sekulić & (Kingdom of Yugoslavia) Ivan Kumanudi	Stadion Jugoslavije
ASK Primorje	Ljubljana	(Austria) Erwin Puschner	Stadion ob Tyrševi cesti
JŠK Slavija	Osijek	(Kingdom of Yugoslavia) Oskar Gasteiger (Kingdom of Yugoslavia) Dimitrije Isailović	
Slavija	Sarajevo	(Kingdom of Yugoslavia) Risto Šošić	

Managerial changes during season

- BSK – Sándor Nemes, replaced by Nikola Simić, replaced by Josef Uridil
- Građanski – James Donnelly replaced by Toni Ringer
- Primorje – Nedeljko Buljević replaced by Erwin Puschner

== League table ==
Pos	Team	Pld	W	D	L	GF	GA	GR	Pts
1	BSK	18	11	2	5	48	22	2.182	24
2	SK Jugoslavija	18	10	2	6	40	26	1.538	22
3	Građanski	18	10	2	6	31	29	1.069	22
4	Concordia	18	7	7	4	31	20	1.550	21
5	HAŠK	18	8	4	6	33	33	1.000	20
6	Hajduk Split	18	7	4	7	47	32	1.469	18
7	BASK	18	6	3	9	41	46	0.891	15
8	Slavija Sarajevo	18	7	1	10	26	34	0.765	15
9	Primorje	18	4	5	9	21	43	0.488	13
10	Slavija Osijek	18	3	4	11	21	54	0.389	10

Source: rsssf.org

== Results ==
Home \ Away	BAS	BSK	CON	GRA	HAJ	HŠK	PRI	JUG	SLO	SLS
BASK		3–4	0–1	5–1	4–2	3–2	7–0	2–1	3–3	0–2
BSK	4–3		4–1	1–2	4–0	8–2	4–0	2–3	5–0	1–0
Concordia	9–1	0–0		0–1	1–1	1–1	4–0	2–0	3–0	1–1
Građanski Zagreb	2–1	1–0	1–1		5–1	2–2	2–0	2–1	4–2	1–0
Hajduk Split	4–1	1–1	0–1	2–1		1–3	3–0	5–2	9–0	10–1
HAŠK	3–2	1–0	1–0	2–1	1–1		4–0	1–4	3–0	4–1
Primorje	3–1	1–4	1–1	2–3	2–2	0–0		3–2	3–0	3–1
SK Jugoslavija	2–2	3–2	5–0	1–0	3–1	2–1	1–1		5–1	3–0
Slavija Osijek	1–1	1–3	1–1	2–1	0–3	5–2	1–1	0–2		3–2
Slavija Sarajevo	0–1	0–1	1–2	6–1	2–1	2–0	3–1	1–0	3–1	

Source: DataSoccer.it
Legend: Blue = home team win; Yellow = draw; Red = away team win.

== Winning squad ==
Champions:

BSK (coach: Josef Uridil)

- Franjo Glaser
- Predrag Radovanović
- Milorad Mitrović
- Vlastimir Petković
- Milorad Arsenijević
- Ivan Stevović
- Radivoj Božić
- Bruno Knežević
- Aleksandar Tirnanić
- Joška Nikolić
- Slavko Šurdonja
- Vojin Božović
- Blagoje Marjanović
- Djordje Vujadinović
- Svetislav Glišović
- Ljubiša Đorđević

== Top scorers ==
Final goalscoring position, number of goals, player/players and club.

- 17 goals – Leo Lemešić (Hajduk Split)
- 15 goals - Aleksandar Tomašević (BASK)
- 14 goals – Aleksandar Živković (Građanski)
- 13 goals – Đorđe Vujadinović (BSK), Egidije Martinović (Concordia)
- 12 goals – Blagoje Marjanović (BSK), Slobodan Babamović (BASK)
- 10 goals – Franjo Petrak (HAŠK)

== See also ==
- Yugoslav Cup
- Yugoslav Football Championship
- Football Association of Yugoslavia
