= Vojin Božović =

Yugoslav footballer (1913–1983)

Personal information
- Date of birth: 1 January 1913
- Place of birth: Cetinje, Kingdom of Montenegro
- Date of death: 19 April 1983 (aged 70)
- Place of death: Belgrade, SFR Yugoslavia
- Position: Forward

Senior career*
Years	Team	Apps	(Gls)
1931–xxx	Budućnost Podgorica		
- Jugoslavija
- SK Obilić
- Mačva Šabac
- Jugoslavija
- SK Anastas Beograd
1934–1940	BSK	62	(34)
1945	SR Crna Gora		
1946–1949	Budućnost Titograd	52	(25)

International career
1936–1941	Kingdom of Yugoslavia	8	(5)

Managerial career
- 1946–1955: Budućnost Titograd
- 1955–1956: Radnički Beograd
- 1956–1958: BSK Beograd
- 1958–1959: Sarajevo
- 1959–1960: OFK Beograd
- 1964–1965: Libya
- 1967–1970: Qadsia
- * Club domestic league appearances and goals

Vojin "Škoba" Božović (Cyrillic: Војин Божовић; 1 January 1913 – 19 April 1983) was a Yugoslav and Montenegrin football player and manager.

== Playing career ==
=== Club ===
He started playing in 1931 in the youth squad of Podgorica's Budućnost and Belgrade's SK Jugoslavija. He represented SK Obilić, where he formed the front line with the brothers Boža and Kojke Popović, Mačva Šabac, where he played along his brother Vida, SK Jugoslavija and SK Anastas. His best years were spent while playing in BSK where, alongside the best country's players Aleksandar Tirnanić, Đorđe Vujadinović, Moša Marjanović, and Svetislav Glišović, won three national titles. After the end of World War II, he played for SR Montenegro in the 1945 championship, and since the reestablishment of the league, he played for Budućnost Titograd where he held the managerial job, as well.

=== International ===
Beside eleven matches played for Belgrade city selection, and three matches for the Yugoslav B team, he played 8 matches for the Yugoslavia national football team, having scored five goals. His debut was in a friendly match on 6 September 1936 in Belgrade against Poland (9–3 win), where he scored two goals, and his last match was in the last match before World War II, against Hungary in Belgrade (1–1).

== Coaching career ==
He started coaching while still was playing, doing both functions, in Budućnost Titograd. He was the main coach of Yugoslav First League clubs like Radnički Beograd, BSK Beograd, latter called OFK, and FK Sarajevo. For many years he worked abroad, in Libya and Kuwait.

== Honours ==
BSK

- Yugoslav Championship: 1935, 1936, 1938–39
