= Nikola Marjanović (footballer, born 1905) =

Serbian footballer

Personal information
- Full name: Nikola Marjanović
- Date of birth: 10 October 1905
- Place of birth: Belgrade, Kingdom of Serbia
- Date of death: 6 March 1983 (aged 77)
- Place of death: Belgrade, SFR Yugoslavia
- Position: Forward

Senior career*
Years	Team	Apps	(Gls)
1920–1924	SK Jugoslavija		
1924–1936	BSK Beograd	35	(13)

International career
1933	Kingdom of Yugoslavia	1	(0)
- * Club domestic league appearances and goals

Nikola Marjanović (Serbian Cyrillic: Никола Марјановић; 10 October 1905 – 6 March 1983) was a Serbian football player and manager.

== Early life ==
Marjanović was born in Belgrade to a merchant father Dimitrije and a housewife mother Sofija. He grew up on the outskirts of Belgrade in 7 Đakovačka Street with his younger brother Blagoje "Moša".

== Playing career ==
=== Club career ===
He started his career in 1920 with SK Jugoslavija, where he played until 1924, when he moved to BSK Beograd and remained there until 1936. With BSK, he won four national championship titles (1931, 1933, 1935, and 1936).

=== International career ===
He was a non-playing member of the Kingdom of Yugoslavia national team (then known officially as the Kingdom of Serbs, Croats, and Slovenes) at the 1928 Summer Olympics. He made his first and only appearance for the Kingdom of Yugoslavia on 3 April 1933 against Spain in Belgrade when he replaced Svetislav Valjarević in the 40th minute.

== Post-playing career ==
He also worked as a coach, leading the youth of Partizan and Rad. He finished his sports career in 1940. As an employee of the Belgrade Electric Central, he retired on 1 May 1962.
