= 1930 Yugoslav Football Championship =

Yugoslav State Championship
- Season: 1930
- Dates: 7 September – 9 November
- Champions: Concordia (1st title)
- Top goalscorer: Blagoje Marjanović (10)

The 1930 State Championship (Serbo-Croato-Slovenian: Državno prvenstvo 1930. / Државно првенство 1930.) had the number of teams participating raised to six. The champion, Concordia Zagreb, was a newly formed team consisting of previous HAŠK players.

== Qualifiers ==
Locations of teams in 1930 Yugoslav First League

In 1930, two new sub-associations were formed. On April 13, the sub-association of Novi Sad was created, which would include the clubs from the districts of Novi Sad, Sremska Mitrovica, and Šabac. A month later, on May 9, the sub-association of Veliki Bečkerek was formed, including the clubs from Veliki Bečkerek, Vršac, Kikinda, and Pančevo districts.

Just as in the previous seasons, the two best-placed teams from the sub-associations of Belgrade and Zagreb would compete, while the rest of the sub-associations would qualify their champion. The Yugoslav Football Association, in order to increase the number of teams in the final stage, made some alterations, including that the first two teams positioned in the previous season (Hajduk Split and BSK) qualify directly to the final stage.

The representatives were:

- Sub-association of Belgrade: BSK (qualified directly) and SK Jugoslavija
- Sub-association of Zagreb: HAŠK and Concordia Zagreb
- Sub-association of Split: Hajduk Split (qualified directly)
- Sub-association of Ljubljana: Ilirija
- Sub-association of Osijek: Slavija Osijek
- Sub-association of Sarajevo: Slavija Sarajevo
- Sub-association of Skoplje: Empty
- Sub-association of Subotica: Bačka

Qualifying round:

- Bačka – Jugoslavija 2:1, 0:6
- HAŠK – Slavija Osijek 3:3, 3:3 extra match: 1:1
- Ilirija – Concordia 1:6, 0:6
- Slavija Sarajevo was qualified as the Sub-association of Skoplje failed to present their team.

The qualified teams were Jugoslavija, Slavija Osijek, Concordia Zagreb, and Slavija Sarajevo. The first leg matches were played on July 6, with the second leg matches on July 13. The extra match between Slavija Osijek and HAŠK was played in Osijek on July 14. The Sub-association of Skoplje failed to present a champion as three clubs finished the league with equal number of points: Jug, SSK, and Sparta.

== Teams ==
Location of teams in the 1930 Yugoslav championship

As of end of season, in September 1935

Team	City	Managers	Ground
HŠK Concordia	Zagreb	(Kingdom of Yugoslavia) Bogdan Cuvaj	
SK Jugoslavija	Belgrade	(Kingdom of Yugoslavia) Dragan Jovanović	Stadion Jugoslavije
JSK Hajduk	Split	(Austria) Erwin Puschner	Stari plac
BSK	Belgrade	Adolf Engel	
SK Slavija	Sarajevo	(Kingdom of Yugoslavia) Risto Šošić	
JŠK Slavija	Osijek	(Hungary) István Palkó & (Kingdom of Yugoslavia) Ljubomir Kniffer	

Managerial changes during season

- Hajduk Split – Luka Kaliterna replaced by Erwin Puschner

== League table ==
Pos	Team	Pld	W	D	L	GF	GA	GR	Pts
1	Concordia	10	6	3	1	25	15	1.667	15
2	SK Jugoslavija	10	5	3	2	23	13	1.769	13
3	Hajduk Split	10	5	3	2	21	17	1.235	13
4	BSK	10	5	2	3	26	16	1.625	12
5	Slavija Sarajevo	10	2	2	6	15	23	0.652	6
6	Slavija Osijek	10	0	1	9	6	32	0.188	1

Source: rsssf.org

== Results ==
Home \ Away	BSK	CON	HAJ	JUG	SLO	SLS
BSK		2–2	5–2	2–1	2–1	5–2
Concordia	4–2		1–1	2–1	4–1	3–0
Hajduk Split	3–1	5–1		2–2	2–0	3–1
SK Jugoslavija	2–1	2–2	1–1		5–0	2–1
Slavija Osijek	0–6	0–2	1–3	0–3		1–1
Slavija Sarajevo	0–0	1–3	4–0	2–4	3–2	

Source: DataSoccer.it
Legend: Blue = home team win; Yellow = draw; Red = away team win.

== Winning squad ==
Champions:

CONCORDIA ZAGREB (coach: Bogdan Cuvaj)

- (Kingdom of Yugoslavia) Sergije Demić (10/0)
- (Kingdom of Yugoslavia) Stjepan Pavičić (10/0)
- (Kingdom of Yugoslavia) Boško Ralić (9/0)
- (Kingdom of Yugoslavia) Nikola Pavelić (8/0)
- (Kingdom of Yugoslavia) Daniel Premerl (6/1)
- (Kingdom of Yugoslavia) Gustav Remec (4/0)
- (Kingdom of Yugoslavia) Miloš Ferić (3/0)
- (Kingdom of Yugoslavia) Radovan Pavelić (10/4)
- (Kingdom of Yugoslavia) Dragutin Babić (10/0)
- (Kingdom of Yugoslavia) Edigio Martinović (10/1)
- (Kingdom of Yugoslavia) Ivan Pavelić (10/10)
- (Kingdom of Yugoslavia) Boris Praunberger (9/3)
- (Kingdom of Yugoslavia) Aleksandar Živković (8/5)
- (Kingdom of Yugoslavia) Vladimir Lolić (1/0)
- (Kingdom of Yugoslavia) Pavao Löw (1/0)
- (Kingdom of Yugoslavia) Božidar Armano (1/0)

== Top scorers ==
Final goalscoring position, number of goals, player/players and club.

- 1 - 10 goals - Blagoje Marjanović (BSK)
- 2 - 9 goals - Đorđe Vujadinović (BSK)
- 3 - 7 goals - Ivan Pavelić (Concordia), Leo Lemešić (Hajduk Split)

== See also ==
- Yugoslav Cup
- Yugoslav League Championship
- Football Association of Yugoslavia
