= Gazzari =

Gazzari is an Italian surname. Notable people with the surname include:

- Julije Gazzari, Croatian and Yugoslav lawyer and politician
- Lorenzo Gazzari (1907–1998), Italian footballer
- Otmar Gazzari (1905–1987), Italian footballer
- Pablo Gazzarri, Argentine priest presumed murdered in the Dirty War
- Tone Gazzari, Croatian and Yugoslav swimmer
