= Radivoj Božić =

Yugoslav footballer (1912–1947)

Personal information
- Date of birth: 26 January 1912
- Place of birth: Beška, Austro-Hungary
- Date of death: 30 November 1947 (aged 35)
- Place of death: Belgrade, SFR Yugoslavia
- Position: Defender

Senior career*
Years	Team	Apps	(Gls)
1930–1932	Jugoslavija	4	(0)
1933–1936	BSK	26	(0)
1936–1941	Vojvodina		

International career
1934	Yugoslavia	1	(0)
- * Club domestic league appearances and goals

Radivoj Božić (Serbian Cyrillic: Радивој Божић; 26 January 1912 – 30 November 1947) was a Yugoslav international footballer. After finishing his football career he became a military pilot in the Royal Yugoslav Air Force and during the Second World War for the Yugoslav Partisans.

== Career ==
Born in Beška, Austro-Hungarian Empire (nowadays in Serbia), he started playing in SK Jugoslavija in 1930. In 1932 he moved to BSK and a year later he won the 1933 Yugoslav Football Championship playing as a left-back. During the late 1930s until 1941 he played with FK Vojvodina.

Božić played one match in the Yugoslavia national team. It was played in Athens, Greece, on 25 December 1934 in a Balkan Cup match against Bulgaria, a 4–3 win. Yugoslavia won the tournament that year.

== Honours ==
BSK

- Yugoslav Football Championship: 1933, 1935, 1936

Yugoslavia

- Balkan Cup: 1935

== Military pilot ==
He graduated on 12 October 1938 at the Royal Yugoslav Air Force military academy and became military pilot. During Second World War he joined the air force of the Yugoslav Partisans, however he got captured by the Germans who sent him to Germany. It is not exactly known when and why he returned to Belgrade, but allegedly because of treason, he was shot by the new Yugoslav authorities in 1948.
