= 1937–38 Yugoslav Football Championship =

15th State Championship
- Season: 1937–38
- Dates: 22 August 1937 – 5 June 1938
- Champions: HAŠK (1st title)
- Matches: 90
- Goals: 318 (3.53 per match)
- Top goalscorer: August Lešnik (17)

The 1937–38 Yugoslav Football Championship officially called State Championship (Serbo-Croatian and Slovene: Državno prvenstvo; Serbian Cyrillic: Државно првенство), was the 15th season of the main association football competition in the Kingdom of Yugoslavia.

The defending champions were Građanski Zagreb, who finished third. The season was won by their cross-city rivals HAŠK. This was their first and only Yugoslav league title before the outbreak of World War II and the club's dissolution in 1945.

Top scorer was Građanski Zagreb's August Lešnik, who scored 17 goals in 16 appearances.

== Teams ==
As of June 1938 and end of season

| Team | City | Managers | Ground |
|---|---|---|---|
| BASK | Belgrade | (Austria) Hans Bloch | |
| BSK | Beograd | (Hungary) Sándor Nemes | |
| Concordia | Zagreb | (Hungary) Béla Virág & (Kingdom of Yugoslavia) Božidar Ralić | Stadion Concordije |
| Građanski | Zagreb | (Hungary) Márton Bukovi | Stadion Građanskog |
| Hajduk | Split | (Hungary) Illés Spitz | Stari plac |
| HAŠK | Zagreb | (Hungary) Zoltán Opata | Stadion HAŠK |
| SK Jedinstvo | Belgrade | (Kingdom of Yugoslavia) Branislav Sekulić | Stadion Jedinstva |
| SK Jugoslavija | Belgrade | (Kingdom of Yugoslavia) Božidar Đorđević | Stadion Jugoslavije |
| SK Ljubljana | Ljubljana | (Kingdom of Yugoslavia) Nedeljko Buljević | Stadion ob Tyrševi cesti |
| Slavija | Sarajevo | (Kingdom of Yugoslavia) Branimir Porobić | |

Managerial changes during season

- Hajduk Split – Karel Senecký replaced by Illés Spitz
- SK Jugoslavija – Franjo Giller replaced by Božidar Đorđević
- HAŠK – František Koželuh replaced by Zoltán Opata

== League table ==
| Pos | Team | Pld | W | D | L | GF | GA | GAv | Pts |
|---|---|---|---|---|---|---|---|---|---|
| 1 | HAŠK (C) | 18 | 12 | 2 | 4 | 40 | 20 | 2.000 | 26 |
| 2 | BSK | 18 | 11 | 4 | 3 | 45 | 25 | 1.800 | 26 |
| 3 | Građanski Zagreb | 18 | 11 | 3 | 4 | 54 | 23 | 2.348 | 25 |
| 4 | BASK | 18 | 8 | 2 | 8 | 36 | 33 | 1.091 | 18 |
| 5 | Slavija Sarajevo | 18 | 7 | 4 | 7 | 25 | 28 | 0.893 | 18 |
| 6 | SK Jugoslavija | 18 | 6 | 5 | 7 | 26 | 21 | 1.238 | 17 |
| 7 | Hajduk Split | 18 | 6 | 5 | 7 | 31 | 38 | 0.816 | 17 |
| 8 | SK Jedinstvo | 18 | 4 | 4 | 10 | 13 | 36 | 0.361 | 12 |
| 9 | SK Ljubljana | 18 | 3 | 5 | 10 | 24 | 42 | 0.571 | 11 |
| 10 | Concordia (R) | 18 | 4 | 2 | 12 | 24 | 52 | 0.462 | 10 |

Source: rsssf.org
(C) Champions; (R) Relegated

== Results ==
| Home \ Away | BAS | BSK | CON | GRA | HAJ | HŠK | JED | JUG | LJU | SLA |
|---|---|---|---|---|---|---|---|---|---|---|
| BASK | | 2–4 | 6–0 | 2–5 | 3–3 | 1–2 | 2–1 | 1–0 | 6–2 | 2–0 |
| BSK | 2–1 | | 6–1 | 0–2 | 4–0 | 4–1 | 2–0 | 3–0 | 5–3 | 1–1 |
| Concordia | 1–1 | 3–0 | | 1–6 | 1–0 | 1–2 | 1–2 | 1–0 | 4–2 | 1–3 |
| Građanski Zagreb | 9–2 | 1–3 | 5–1 | | 3–2 | 3–0 | 6–0 | 3–2 | 5–1 | 0–0 |
| Hajduk Split | 0–1 | 3–1 | 4–2 | 1–1 | | 2–0 | 2–0 | 2–2 | 3–2 | 3–1 |
| HAŠK | 2–0 | 1–2 | 4–1 | 2–2 | 6–1 | | 4–0 | 1–1 | 3–0 | 4–1 |
| SK Jedinstvo | 1–0 | 0–2 | 1–0 | 0–1 | 2–2 | 1–4 | | 0–0 | 0–0 | 1–0 |
| SK Jugoslavija | 0–4 | 0–0 | 5–1 | 3–1 | 5–0 | 0–1 | 3–0 | | 3–0 | 2–0 |
| SK Ljubljana | 0–2 | 2–2 | 2–2 | 1–0 | 2–2 | 0–1 | 2–2 | 3–0 | | 2–1 |
| Slavija Sarajevo | 1–0 | 4–4 | 3–2 | 2–1 | 2–1 | 0–2 | 5–2 | 0–0 | 1–0 | |

Source: DataSoccer.it
Legend: Blue = home team win; Yellow = draw; Red = away team win.

== Winning squad ==
Champions: HAŠK (Coach: František Koželuh; then Zoltán Opata)

- GK – Josip Žmara (18)
- GK – Borivoj Konstantinović (18)
- DF – Zeno Golac (18)
- DF – Nikola Pajević (18)
- DF – Ivica Gajer (17/1)
- DF – Stjepan Horvat (17/6)
- DF – Miroslav Pleše (3)
- FW – Ico Hitrec (18/14)
- FW – Ratko Kacian (18/8)
- FW – Milivoj Fink (16/2)
- FW –Nikola Duković (16/1)
- FW – Svetozar Peričić (6/4)
- FW – Ivan Medarić (6)
- FW – Mićel Kokić (6)
- FW – Antun Hrubec (3)

== Top scorers ==
Final goalscoring position, number of goals, player/players and club.

- 17 goals – August Lešnik (Građanski)
- 14 goals – Ivan Hitrec (HAŠK)
- 13 goals – Blagoje Marjanović (BSK)
- 12 goals - Aleksandar Petrović (Jugoslavija)
- 11 goals – Svetislav Valjarević (BSK)
- 10 goals – Milan Antolković (Građanski)
- 9 goals – Ratomir Čabrić (BASK)
- 8 goals – Ratko Kacian (HAŠK), Aleksandar Tomašević (BASK)

== See also ==
- Yugoslav Cup
- Yugoslav League Championship
- Football Association of Yugoslavia
