= Blagoje Marjanović =

Serbian footballer (1907–1984)

Personal information
- Date of birth: 9 September 1907
- Place of birth: Belgrade, Kingdom of Serbia
- Date of death: 1 October 1984 (aged 77)
- Place of death: Belgrade, SR Serbia, SFR Yugoslavia
- Position: Forward

Youth career
- SK Jugoslavija

Senior career*
| Years | Team | Apps | (Gls) |
| 1925–1939 | BSK | 118 | (90) |
| 1939 | SK Jugoslavija | | |
| 1939–1941 | Čukarički | | |
| 1947 | Dinamo Pančevo | 4 | (0) |
| 1950–1951 | Dinamo Pančevo | 1 | (0) |
| Total | | 123 | (90) |

International career
| 1926–1938 | Yugoslavia | 58 | (37) |

Managerial career
- 1947–1948: Dinamo Pančevo
- 1948–1949: Proleter Osijek
- 1951: Dinamo Pančevo
- 1953–1956: BSK
- 1957–1958: Torino
- 1958–1959: Catania
- 1959: Pobeda
- * Club domestic league appearances and goals

Blagoje "Moša" Marjanović (Serbian Cyrillic: Благоје "Моша" Марјановић, pronounced [blâɡoje marjǎːnoʋitɕ]; 9 September 1907 – 1 October 1984) was a Serbian football player and manager.

== Early life ==
Born to merchant father Dimitrije and housewife mother Sofija, young Blagoje grew up on the outskirts of Belgrade in 7 Đakovačka Street with his older brother Nikola who was also a footballer.

== Club career ==
Marjanović was one of the best football forwards in the Kingdom of Yugoslavia. He played for BSK (1927–39), with whom he won five league titles (1931, 1933, 1935, 1936, and 1939) and three times was the best league goal scorer (1930, 1935, 1937).

After returning from South America, this striker became (alongside his teammate Tirnanić), first professional footballer in Yugoslavia (although he had a little bit higher salary then Tirnanić). For his services at BSK Marjanović was paid YUS1,800 per month. The exchange rate of the dinar against the US dollar in December 1930 was $1 = YUS56.39 meaning that his monthly salary was $32 (about $446 in 2014 dollar). He and Tirnanić formed one of the greatest partnerships in Yugoslavian football history.

He quickly became a first team member and a member of the national team. It was almost unthinkable that the game would go by without Marjanović scoring a goal for BSK. Ljubomir Vukadinović, columnist in the Serbian newspaper Politika, stated on the basis of which the book, the first about an athlete in Yugoslavia, "1000 goals of Moše Marjanović" (1936), was written in our newspaper on the day of the match, wrote that he is the best Yugoslav footballer since 1928. Marjanović had tempting offers to go to France, but did not accept any.

== International career ==
For the national team, he debuts on 28 June 1926 in a friendly match against Czechoslovakia (2–6) in Zagreb. The first goal he scored on 15 May 1927 against Bulgaria in Sofia when in the last five minutes he scored two goals in the match. During his career, he scored 37 goals in 58 games for the national team (unbroken record, until Bobek came, and scored 38 goals in 63 games, although Marjanović has a better scoring ratio at 0,63 goals per game), and 575 goals in 14 seasons for his club BSK. He participated in the 1928 Olympic Games in Amsterdam, and in the first FIFA World Cup in Uruguay, in which he helped his nation win a bronze medal. He scored one goal in that tournament in a game against Bolivia. By an administrative decision by FIFA in 1986, Yugoslavia was placed in 4th place in that tournament, just behind the USA team, although the match for third place was never played. FIFA was guided by the fact that the teams of the USA and Yugoslavia had the same number of wins and losses in the championship (2–1), but the USA had a better goal difference, so FIFA officially takes the USA as third place in the 1930 World Cup. But the match for third place was not played, so the eternal question of which team was better will remain open.

Marjanović scored a few hat-trick for his nation national, most memorably against Brazil in 1934, in a friendly game in Belgrade, to help his side to an 8–4 win. Many football experts of that time showed great appreciation for "Moša's" skills, including Hugo Meisl (creator and coach of the Austrian "Wunderteam") who claimed that with Marjanović in the attacking line "Wunderteam" would be perfect. He then won back-to-back Balkan Cups with Yugoslavia, in 1934–35 and 1935, contributing with 1 and 3 goals respectively. With 9 goals in the Balkan Cup, he is among the all-time top goalscorers in the competition's history. He played his last match for the national team on 3 April 1938 against Poland in a World Cup qualifier, going off in style as he netted the only goal of the match.

According to a biography of his time, Marjanović scored more than 1,000 goals in his career.

== Style of play ==
Marjanović played as a forward for both his club and the Yugoslav national team. Known for his tactical positioning, he was noted for his ability to coordinate with various teammates, including Tirnanić. While his shot power was considered average, he was an accurate finisher from multiple positions and was proficient in aerial play. His scoring techniques included volleys, which were a specialty, and he was a regular free-kick taker.

"Moša was neither Sindelar, nor Meazza, nor Hitrec, nor Lešnik. He was simply himself, a player of his own style and charm, completely different from all the aces of his predecessors and those who succeeded him. This blond-haired, strong athlete, whose eyes are gentle and warm, harmless as in a big boy, whose figure in a sports jersey is caressed by thousands of eyes, whose darting rush to the goal stops the breath and accelerates the beating of the heart, whose shot causes a delirium of delight. it spins, boils and roars, while thousands rejoice or suffer." - Aleksandar Tirnanić.

He is the famous Moša, part of the famous Moša - Tirka duo, which many consider one of the best duos in the history of the national team.

== Coaching career ==
During his coaching career, he first led Proleter Osijek then OFK Beograd, with whom he won the national cup in 1955. After this, Marshal Tito honored Marjanovic with the Yugoslavian Order of Merit of the People. Also in 1955, Marjanović went on a tour to Asia where he had the honor to meet Chinese People's Leader Mao Zedong. He was later a coach in the Italian league (one year in AC Torino and one year in Calcio Catania). He returned to Yugoslavia and became a coach for FK Pobeda. After a match in 1961, Marjanović suffered a stroke. He never regained his speech and the right side of his body was paralyzed. He died in 1984. In the former Yugoslavia, he was also remembered for his statement: Football is my life.

== Personal life ==
Marjanovic enjoyed great fame. He was a national superstar but also a playboy, up to the moment when his club played against Hajduk, in Split. On the eve of the match, he met a Dalmatian girl who supported Hajduk. They married in 1938 with great interest of the public and journalists. During the German invasion on Yugoslavia, he was captured as a truck driver of the Yugoslav Royal Army and placed in a prison camp in Fürstenberg, Germany. In the midst of adversity, sometimes they organized football matches between "war prisoners" versus "the guardians". When the war ended, he returned to Yugoslavia and played for Dinamo Pančevo (1945–48). His career ended in Proleter from Osijek (1949).

=== Film ===
In the films Montevideo, God Bless You! (2010) and See You in Montevideo (2014), Marjanović was portrayed by actor Petar Strugar.

== Career statistics ==
=== Club ===
Appearances and goals by club, season and competition
| Club | Season | League | | | Cup | | Continental | | Other | | Total | |
| Club | Season | Division | Apps | Goals | Apps | Goals | Apps | Goals | Apps | Goals | Apps | Goals |
|---|---|---|---|---|---|---|---|---|---|---|---|---|
| BSK | 1925 | Yugoslav Championship | 0 | 0 | | | — | | | | 0 | 0 |
| BSK | 1926 | Yugoslav Championship | 0 | 0 | | | — | | | | 0 | 0 |
| BSK | 1927 | Yugoslav Championship | 5 | 2 | | | 2 (Note: Appearances in Mitropa Cup) | 0 | | | 7 | 2 |
| BSK | 1928 | Yugoslav Championship | 1 | 0 | | | 2 | 1 | | | 3 | 1 |
| BSK | 1929 | Yugoslav Championship | 7 | 6 | | | — | | | | 7 | 6 |
| BSK | 1930 | Yugoslav Championship | 10 | 10 | | | — | | | | 10 | 10 |
| BSK | 1931 | Yugoslav Championship | 10 | 8 | | | — | | | | 10 | 8 |
| BSK | 1932 | Yugoslav Championship | 4 | 1 | | | — | | | | 4 | 1 |
| BSK | 1933 | Yugoslav Championship | 20 | 15 | | | — | | | | 20 | 15 |
| BSK | 1934 | — | | | 4 | 9 | — | | | | 4 | 9 |
| BSK | 1935 | Yugoslav Championship | 18 | 12 | | | — | | | | 18 | 12 |
| BSK | 1936 | Yugoslav Championship | 5 | 4 | | | — | | | | 5 | 4 |
| BSK | 1936–37 | Yugoslav Championship | 17 | 19 | | | — | | | | 17 | 19 |
| BSK | 1937–38 | Yugoslav Championship | 18 | 13 | | | 1 | 0 | | | 19 | 13 |
| BSK | 1938–39 | Yugoslav Championship | 3 | 0 | | | 1 | 0 | | | 4 | 0 |
| BSK | Total | | 118 | 90 | 4 | 9 | 6 | 1 | | | 128 | 100 |
| Dinamo Pančevo | 1947–48 | Yugoslav Second League | 4 | 0 | — | | — | | — | | 4 | 0 |
| Dinamo Pančevo | 1950 | Yugoslav Third League | | | — | | — | | — | | | |
| Dinamo Pančevo | 1951 | Yugoslav Second League | 1 | 0 | — | | — | | — | | 1 | 0 |
| Dinamo Pančevo | Total | | 5 | 0 | | | | | | | 5 | 0 |

=== International ===
Yugoslavia's goal tally first

| # | Date | Venue | Opponent | Score | Result | Competition |
|---|---|---|---|---|---|---|
| 1 | 15 May 1927 | Slavia Stadium, Sofia, Bulgaria | Bulgaria | 1–0 | 2–0 | Friendly |
| 2 | 15 May 1927 | Slavia Stadium, Sofia, Bulgaria | Bulgaria | 2–0 | 2–0 | Friendly |
| 3 | 25 March 1928 | Üllői úti stadion, Budapest, Hungary | Hungary | 0–1 | 2–1 | Friendly |
| 4 | 6 May 1928 | Stadion SK Jugoslavija, Belgrade, Yugoslavia | Romania | 2–0 | 3–1 | 1928 King Aleksandar Cup |
| 5 | 19 May 1929 | Stade Olympique Yves-du-Manoir, Colombes, France | France | 2–0 | 3–1 | Friendly |
| 6 | 28 June 1929 | Stadion Concordije, Zagreb, Yugoslavia | Czechoslovakia | 2–2 | 3–3 | Friendly |
| 7 | 28 June 1929 | Stadion Concordije, Zagreb, Yugoslavia | Czechoslovakia | 3–2 | 3–3 | Friendly |
| 8 | 6 October 1929 | ONEF Stadium, Bucharest, Romania | Romania | 1–2 | 1–2 | 1929–31 Balkan Cup |
| 9 | 13 April 1930 | BSK Stadion, Belgrade, Yugoslavia | Bulgaria | 2–0 | 6–1 | Friendly |
| 10 | 13 April 1930 | BSK Stadion, Belgrade, Yugoslavia | Bulgaria | 4–1 | 6–1 | Friendly |
| 11 | 17 July 1930 | Estadio Gran Parque Central, Montevideo, Uruguay | Bolivia | 2–0 | 4–0 | 1930 FIFA World Cup |
| 12 | 3 August 1930 | Estadio Alvear y Tagle, Buenos Aires, Argentina | Argentina | 1–3 | 1–3 | Friendly |
| 13 | 16 November 1930 | Slavia Stadium, Sofia, Bulgaria | Bulgaria | 2–0 | 3–0 | 1929–31 Balkan Cup |
| 14 | 19 April 1931 | Stadion SK Jugoslavija, Belgrade, Yugoslavia | Bulgaria | 1–0 | 1–0 | 1929–31 Balkan Cup |
| 15 | 21 May 1931 | BSK Stadion, Belgrade, Yugoslavia | Hungary | 1–0 | 3–2 | Friendly |
| 16 | 28 June 1931 | Stadion Maksimir, Zagreb, Yugoslavia | Romania | 1–1 | 2–4 | 1929–31 Balkan Cup |
| 17 | 2 August 1931 | Stadion SK Jugoslavija, Belgrade, Yugoslavia | Czechoslovakia | 2–0 | 2–1 | Friendly |
| 18 | 4 October 1931 | Yunak Stadium, Sofia, Bulgaria | Bulgaria | 2–0 | 3–2 | 1931 Balkan Cup |
| 19 | 30 April 1933 | Stadion SK Jugoslavija, Belgrade, Yugoslavia | Spain | 1–1 | 1–1 | Friendly |
| 20 | 24 September 1933 | BSK Stadion, Belgrade, Yugoslavia | Switzerland | 2–0 | 2–2 | 1934 FIFA World Cup qualification |
| 21 | 18 March 1934 | Stadion AS 23, Sofia, Bulgaria | Bulgaria | 1–0 | 2–1 | Friendly |
| 22 | 18 March 1934 | Stadion AS 23, Sofia, Bulgaria | Bulgaria | 2–0 | 2–1 | Friendly |
| 23 | 3 June 1934 | BSK Stadion, Belgrade, Yugoslavia | Brazil | 3–3 | 8–4 | Friendly |
| 24 | 3 June 1934 | BSK Stadion, Belgrade, Yugoslavia | Brazil | 6–3 | 8–4 | Friendly |
| 25 | 3 June 1934 | BSK Stadion, Belgrade, Yugoslavia | Brazil | 8–3 | 8–4 | Friendly |
| 26 | 26 August 1934 | Stadion SK Jugoslavija, Belgrade, Yugoslavia | Poland | 4–1 | 4–1 | Friendly |
| 27 | 16 December 1934 | Parc des Princes, Paris, France | France | 1–1 | 2–3 | Friendly |
| 28 | 1 January 1935 | Leoforos Alexandras Stadium, Athens, Greece | Romania | 2–0 | 4–0 | 1934–35 Balkan Cup |
| 29 | 17 June 1935 | Yunak Stadium, Sofia, Bulgaria | Romania | 1–0 | 2–0 | 1935 Balkan Cup |
| 30 | 20 June 1935 | Yunak Stadium, Sofia, Bulgaria | Greece | 2–0 | 6–1 | 1935 Balkan Cup |
| 31 | 24 June 1935 | Yunak Stadium, Sofia, Bulgaria | Bulgaria | 1–0 | 3–3 | 1935 Balkan Cup |
| 32 | 12 July 1936 | Taksim Stadium, Istanbul, Turkey | Turkey | 1–1 | 3–3 | Friendly |
| 33 | 6 September 1936 | BSK Stadion, Belgrade, Yugoslavia | Poland | 1–0 | 9–3 | Friendly |
| 34 | 6 September 1936 | BSK Stadion, Belgrade, Yugoslavia | Poland | 3–0 | 9–3 | Friendly |
| 35 | 6 September 1936 | BSK Stadion, Belgrade, Yugoslavia | Poland | 5–0 | 9–3 | Friendly |
| 36 | 6 September 1936 | BSK Stadion, Belgrade, Yugoslavia | Poland | 8–1 | 9–3 | Friendly |
| 37 | 3 April 1938 | BSK Stadion, Belgrade, Yugoslavia | Poland | 1–0 | 1–0 | 1938 FIFA World Cup qualification |

== Honours ==
=== Player ===
BSK

- Yugoslav Championship: 1931, 1933, 1935, 1936, 1938–39
- Yugoslav Cup: 1934

Yugoslavia

- Balkan Cup: 1934–35, 1935
- Balkan Cup runner-up: 1929–31, 1933

Orders

Order of Saint Sava

=== Manager ===
BSK

- Yugoslav Cup: 1953, 1955
