= 1936 Yugoslav Football Championship =

Yugoslav State Championship
- Season: 1935
- Dates: 7 June 1936 – 2 August 1936
- Champions: BSK (4th title)
- Top goalscorer: Blagoje Marjanović (5)

The 1936 Yugoslav State Championship (Serbo-Croato-Slovenian: Državno prvenstvo 1936 / Државно првенство 1936) was the 13th season of Kingdom of Yugoslavia's premier football competition.

It was played in a cup format from 7 June to 2 August 1936. Compared to the previous season, the number of clubs competing was increased by four to a record fourteen. The competition was marred by withdrawal of already drawn Croatian clubs Concordia Zagreb and Hajduk Split who objected to the format of the competition.

== Tournament ==
=== Round of 16 ===
Team 1	Agg.	Team 2	1st leg	2nd leg
Ljubljana	6–0 (w/o)	Concordia Zagreb	3–0	3–0
ŽAK Subotica	2–5	Slavija Osijek	0–1	2–4
ŽAK Velika Kikinda	3–7	NAK Novi Sad	0–4	3–3
Krajišnik Banja Luka	6–0 (w/o)	Hajduk Split	3–0	3–0
Radnički Kragujevac	2–6	BSK	1–2	1–4
Crnogorac Cetinje	4–5	Slavija Sarajevo	3–3	1–2
Građanski Niš	2–5	Građanski Skopje	2–1	0–4

=== Quarter finals ===
Team 1	Agg.	Team 2	1st leg	2nd leg
Krajišnik Banja Luka	2–7	Ljubljana	1–3	1–4
Slavija Osijek	0–6	NAK Novi Sad	0–4	0–2
Građanski Skopje	3–11	Slavija Sarajevo	2–1	1–10
BSK	bye			

=== Semi finals ===
Team 1	Agg.	Team 2	1st leg	2nd leg
BSK	6–2	Ljubljana	3–1	3–1
NAK Novi Sad	2–4	Slavija Sarajevo	1–1	1–3

=== Final ===
Team 1	Agg.	Team 2	1st leg	2nd leg
Slavija Sarajevo	0–1	BSK	0–1	0–0

== Winning squad ==
Champions:

BSK (Coach: Sándor Nemes)

- Franjo Glaser
- Đorđe Popović
- Predrag Radovanović
- Milorad Mitrović
- Milorad Arsenijević
- Ivan Stevović
- Gustav Lechner
- Aleksandar Tirnanić
- Slavko Šurdonja
- Blagoje Marjanović
- Đorđe Vujadinović
- Vojin Božović
- Svetislav Glišović

== Top scorers ==
Final goalscoring position, number of goals, player/players and club.

- 1 - 5 goals - Blagoje Marjanović (BSK Belgrade)
- 2 - 4 goals - Đorđe Vujadinović (BSK Belgrade), Milan Rajlić (Slavija Sarajevo)

== See also ==
- Yugoslav Cup
- Yugoslav Football Championship
- Football Association of Yugoslavia
