= Geza Šifliš =

Yugoslav association footballer

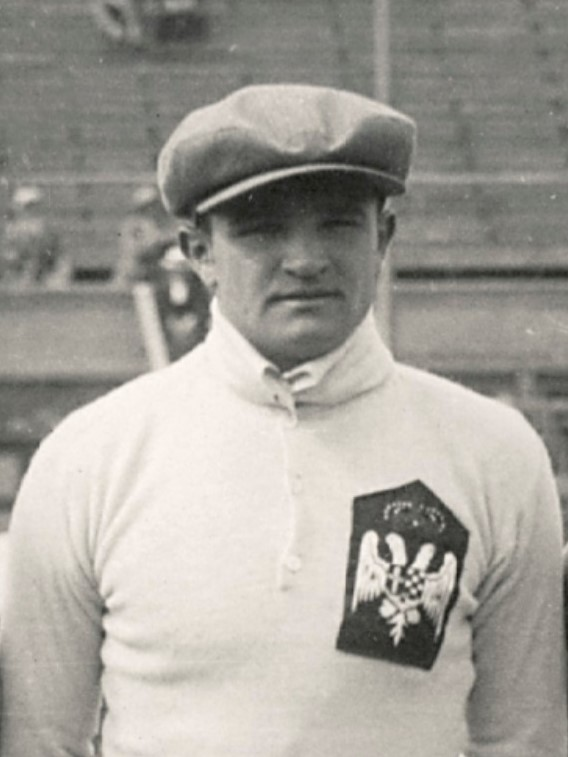
- Šifliš in 1928

Personal information
- Date of birth: 25 February 1907
- Place of birth: Ókeresztúr, Kingdom of Hungary, Austria-Hungary
- Date of death: 18 November 1948 (aged 41)
- Place of death: Baja, Hungary
- Height: 1.92 m (6 ft 3 1/2 in)
- Position: Goalkeeper

Senior career*
Years	Team	Apps	(Gls)
1926–1927	SAND	5	(0)
1929–1930	Ferencváros	4	(0)
1931–1932	Újpest	1	(0)

International career
1927–1928	Kingdom of Serbs, Croats and Slovenes	5	(0)
- * Club domestic league appearances and goals

Geza Šifliš (Serbian Cyrillic: Геза Шифлиш, Hungarian: Siflis Géza; 25 February 1907 – 18 November 1948) was a Yugoslav football goalkeeper of Hungarian ethnicity. He was part of Yugoslavia's team at the 1928 Summer Olympics.

Nicknamed Gouliver for his height and strength, he played in top league clubs in Yugoslavia and Hungary.

== Career ==
Born in Ókeresztúr, Austria-Hungary (nowadays Srpski Krstur, Serbia), he first appeared playing for SAND in the 1927 Yugoslav Football Championship. Then in 1929 he moved to Hungary where he first played with Ferencváros between 1929 and 1930, and then with Újpest between 1931 and 1932.

He played five matches for the Yugoslavia national team, one of them at the 1928 Summer Olympics against Portugal. He played all 5 national team matches while playing with SAND.

He was an ethnic Hungarian, and after joining Hungarian side Ferencváros, he stayed in Hungary. In 1936, he married Hungarian swimmer Magda Szász. He died in Baja, Hungary on 18 November 1948.
