= Mihalj Kečkeš =

Serbian/Yugoslav footballer

Personal information
- Date of birth: 24 September 1913
- Place of birth: Subotica, Austro-Hungary
- Date of death: 31 December 1985 (aged 72)
- Position: Midfielder

Senior career*
Years	Team	Apps	(Gls)
- Bačka 1901
- SAND
1936–1937	ŽAK		
1937–1939	Jedinstvo Belgrade		
- Partizan Subotica

International career
1937–1938	Yugoslavia	2	(0)

Managerial career
- Partizan Subotica
- Radnički Bajmok
- Solid
- * Club domestic league appearances and goals

Mihalj Kečkeš (Serbian Cyrillic: Михаљ Кечкеш; 24 September 1913 – 31 December 1985) was a Yugoslav footballer.

== Playing career ==
=== Club ===
Born in Subotica in 1913, then still within Austro-Hungary, he was a midfielder and he begin his career playing in FK Bačka 1901. He also played with the other two pre-World War II Yugoslav First League clubs from Subotica, SAND and ŽAK before signing with Jedinstvo Belgrade. In January 1937 there was a conflict between ŽAK and Jedinstvo because both clubs had registered the player at the Football Association of Yugoslavia which decided that his registration for Jedinstvo was the valid one.

=== International ===
After moving to Jedinstvo he became Yugoslavia national team player, having played two matches for the national team, one in 1937 and another one in 1938.

== Coaching career ==
After retiring he became a coach in his hometown city of Subotica, where he died in 1985. He was among the founders of FK Partizan Subotica in 1948 and a coach and a player in the club. He was also coach at FK Radnički Bajmok and FK Solid. He is sometimes referred to as Mihajlo Kečkeš.
