= Slavko Šurdonja =

Yugoslav footballer

Personal information
- Date of birth: 1 October 1912
- Place of birth: Sušak, Austria-Hungary
- Date of death: 8 January 1943 (aged 30)
- Place of death: Belgrade, German-occupied Serbia
- Positions: Forward; right midfielder

Senior career*
Years	Team	Apps	(Gls)
- Ortijent Rijeka
–1932	Građanski Zagreb		
1933–1938	BSK	35	(25)
1938–1939	BASK	6	(0)
1941–1942	Bata Borovo		
1942–1943	Jedinstvo Beograd		

International career
1933	Yugoslavia	1	(0)
- * Club domestic league appearances and goals

Slavko Šurdonja (1 October 1912 – 8 January 1943) was a Yugoslav footballer.

== Club career ==
He was famous as being a big, strong forward, with great ball control, excellent shot and an impeccable header.

Šurdonja started playing as right midfielder in his hometown club NK Orijent and spend some time playing in Zagreb's club 1.HŠK Građanski but, his best years were spent playing in BSK, from 1933 until 1938, where he won three national Championships. He played one season for Belgrade's BASK in 1939, and ended his career having already health problems in Belgrade's SK Jedinstvo, where he played until 1943.

He died in Belgrade during World War II, at age 30, from tuberculosis, in great poverty and hunger.

== International career ==
Beside having played three matches for the Belgrade city selection, he played one match for the Yugoslavia national football team. It was in Warsaw on 10 September 1933 against Poland (3–4 loss) and he played as a right midfielder.

== Honours ==
BSK

- Yugoslav Football Championship: 1933, 1935, 1936
