= SAND Subotica =

Association football club in Yugoslavia

SAND
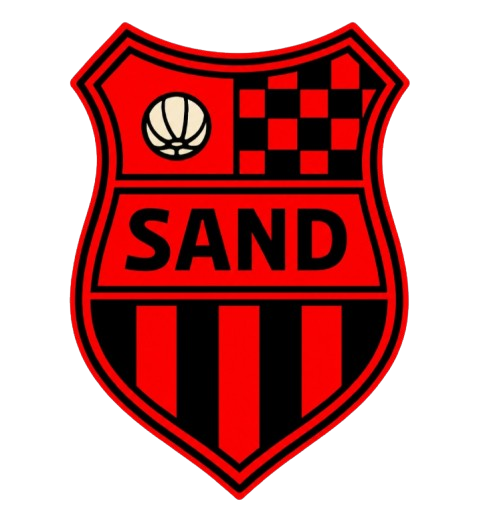
- Full name: Subotičko atletičko nogometno društvo
- Nickname: Subotički crveno-crni (Subotica's red-blacks)
- Founded: 1920; 106 years ago
- Ground: SAND Stadium
- League: Yugoslav First League

Subotičko atletičko nogometno društvo (SAND) (Serbian Cyrillic: Суботичко атлетичко ногометно друштво, САНД) was a football club based in Subotica, Kingdom of Yugoslavia.

It was formed in 1920. It participated in the 1927 Yugoslav Football Championship finishing 4th out of 6. After that accomplishment, two of their best players, Miloš Beleslin and Geza Šifliš, received calls to join the Yugoslavia national team that would play at the 1928 Summer Olympics.

Its stadium was the first in the country to have electrical illumination, still in the 1930s.

SAND came into headlines of the press in 1921 when they brought almost a complete team of the, back then footballistically strong, representative team of Szeged. It was just ahead of a Subotica Football Subassociation First League game against JSD Bačka. Bačka were the title holders and top ranked at the league, and reinforced SAND won by 6:4. The game was played on June 22, 1921. Bačka issued a protest to the direction board of the Subassociation and to the Football Association of Yugoslavia asking about the regularity of this procedure on behalve of SAND which fielded in that game only 4 domestic players while the others, Hungarians, were brought just days before and got permission to play so quickly.

== Notable players ==
The following players have been capped by the Yugoslavia national team:

- Miloš Beleslin
- Janoš Horvat
- Mihalj Kečkeš
- Geza Šifliš
