= ŽAK Subotica =

Association football club

ŽAK Subotica (Serbian Cyrillic: ЖАК Суботица) was a football club based in Subotica, Kingdom of Yugoslavia.

The club was formed in 1921 and the name comes from the initials of Železničarski atletski klub derived from the fact that the club was backed by the Yugoslav Railways company.

It played in the 1935–36 Yugoslav Football Championship where it was eliminated in the round of sixteen by Slavija Osijek. Afterwards, it played in the 1940–41 Serbian League where it finished 5th out of 10.

With the start of the Second World War and the Axis invasion of Yugoslavia, the city came under Hungarian occupation and the club competed in the Hungarian Second League under its Hungarian translated name, Szabadkai Vasutas AC. During this period the coach was Geza Takács and among its best known players was István Nyers who begin his senior career at the club.

After the end of the Second World War, the club made a tour throughout Serbia in order to prepare for competition, however the new socialist authorities demanded that most of the pre-1945 clubs to be disbanded and new clubs to be formed. ŽAK was dissolved in 1945 and its players made a meeting where they decided to join the newly founded FK Spartak Subotica which beside the players, the stadium, the colors and the fans, it also inherited the tradition of being backed by the railways.

== Notable players ==
Players with national team appearances:

(Kingdom of Yugoslavia) Yugoslavia

- Jovan Beleslin
- Miloš Beleslin
- Mihalj Kečkeš
- Tihomir Ognjanov

Hungary

- István Nyers

For a list of former players with Wikipedia article, please see: Category:ŽAK Subotica players.
