= Otmar Gazzari =

Italian footballer (1905–1987)

Personal information
- Full name: Otmar Gazzari
- Date of birth: 1905
- Place of birth: Hvar, Austria-Hungary
- Date of death: 1987 (aged 81–82)
- Place of death: Zagreb, SFR Yugoslavia
- Position: Goalkeeper

Senior career*
Years	Team	Apps	(Gls)
1924–1928	Hajduk Split	17	(0)
1928–1929	Triestina	21	(0)
1931–1933	BSK	16	(0)
Total		54	(0)
- * Club domestic league appearances and goals

Otmar Gazzari (1905 – 1987) was an Italian footballer who played as a goalkeeper. Throughout his career he played for Hajduk Split and BSK in the Yugoslav Football Championship.

While playing in Hajduk Split he played together with his brother Renzo, that would continue his career in Italian Serie A also becoming B international player for the Italy national football team. With Hajduk he played a total of 37 official matches, of which 17 were in the Yugoslav Championship.

Gazzari played a total of 165 matches for Hajduk and won one national championship, before moving to Belgrade to play in BSK where he would be national champion in two more occasions.

Unlike his brother, that after retiring from football dedicated to tennis, Otmar opted to have a career in baseball.

== Honours ==
Hajduk Split

- Yugoslav Football Championship: 1927

BSK

- Yugoslav Football Championship: 1931, 1933
