= Boško Ralić =

Serbian footballer and coach

Boško Ralić Бошко Ралић
Personal information
- Date of birth: 25 November 1904
- Place of birth: Plaški, Austria-Hungary
- Date of death: 17 October 1978 (aged 73)
- Place of death: Belgrade, SFR Yugoslavia
- Position: Right half

Senior career*
Years	Team	Apps	(Gls)
1927–1937	HŠK Concordia		

International career
1932–1933	Kingdom of Yugoslavia	6	(0)

Managerial career
- 1946–1947: Metalac Belgrade
- 1953–1954: Red Star Belgrade
- 1958–1959: Napredak Kruševac
- 1959–1960: Bor
- 1960–?: Red Star Belgrade (reserve team)
- * Club domestic league appearances and goals

Boško "Tatek" Ralić (25 November 1904 – 17 October 1978) was a Serbian football player and coach. He was born in Plaški village near Karlovac, Austria-Hungary, and died in Belgrade, SFR Yugoslavia.

== Playing career ==
Ralić has spent his entire playing career at the right half position. For a decade, from 1927 to 1937, he was a prominent player of Concordia Zagreb, one of the most popular football clubs in the Kingdom of Yugoslavia. Ralić has won two national championships with Concordia, in 1930 and 1932.

He has played six games for the Yugoslavia national football team (1932–1933) and twelve games for the selection of the city of Zagreb (1930–1935). He made his national team debut against Spain on 24 April 1932; the last game he played for the national team was a 5–0 loss against Romania on 11 June 1933. During the time he played for Yugoslavia the national team made two wins and four losses.

== Coaching career ==
At the beginning of the World War II, Ralić escaped from the newly formed Independent State of Croatia, and moved to Belgrade, where he became the head coach of the football section of SK Jedinstvo Beograd. After the war, this club was disbanded, and Ralić became the first head coach of FK Metalac, successor of the pre-war five time national champion BSK and predecessor of today's OFK Beograd. He was the head coach of Metalac in 1946 and 1947, when he left the club and moved to Stara Pazova. He got back to Belgrade in 1950, to coach the youth division of Red Star Belgrade. In 1953, he was appointed the new head coach of Red Star, replacing Ljubiša Broćić, but he remained on this position only until December 1954, when he was replaced by Milovan Ćirić. Later, Ralić coached FK Napredak Kruševac from where he moved to FK Bor in summer 1959. In January 1960, he returned to Red Star Belgrade, this time as the coach of the reserve team, citing family reasons for this decision.
