= Miloš Beleslin =

Yugoslavian footballer

Personal information
- Date of birth: 8 September 1901
- Place of birth: Sereg, Austro-Hungary
- Date of death: 7 March 1984 (aged 82)
- Place of death: Novi Sad, SFR Yugoslavia
- Position: Defender

Senior career*
Years	Team	Apps	(Gls)
1917–1919	Szegedi AK		
1919–1928	NAK Novi Sad		
1928–1930	SAND Subotica		
1930–1933	ŽAK Subotica		

International career
1928–1930	Kingdom of Yugoslavia	8	(1)
- * Club domestic league appearances and goals

Miloš Beleslin (Serbian Cyrillic: Милош Белеслин; 8 September 1901 – 7 March 1984) was a Yugoslavian footballer.

== Club career ==
Born in Sereg, Kingdom of Hungary, Austro-Hungarian Empire, he started playing in Szeged in Szegedi AK. His played his first official match on May 5, 1917. In 1919 his parents moved to the city of Novi Sad in the Kingdom of Serbs, Croats and Slovenes and he joined NAK Novi Sad. Later he would play with other Yugoslav top-league clubs, SAND Subotica and ŽAK Subotica. He played his last official match in 1939 on the day of his anniversary.

== International career ==
Miloš Beleslin played 8 matches for the Yugoslavia national team having scored once. He was part of Yugoslavia's team at the 1928 Summer Olympics, but he did not play in any matches. He received a call to represent Yugoslavia at the 1930 FIFA World Cup however as he was playing in Subotica, his representative subassociation, the Subotica Football Subassociation, boycotted the national team, not allowing him to travel to Uruguay. His final international was a May 1930 King Alexander's Cup against Romania.
