= Lorenzo Gazzari =

Italian footballer (1907–1998)

Renzo Gazzari
Personal information
- Full name: Lorenzo Gazzari
- Date of birth: 7 January 1907
- Place of birth: Hvar, Austria-Hungary
- Date of death: 1998
- Place of death: Florence, Italy
- Height: 1.75 m (5 ft 9 in)
- Position: Left back

Youth career
- 1921–1923: Hajduk Split

Senior career*
| Years | Team | Apps | (Gls) |
| 1923–1928 | Hajduk Split | 10 | (0) |
| 1928–1931 | US Triestina | 90 | (9) |
| 1931–1939 | AC Fiorentina | 212 | (0) |
| 1939–1940 | Rivarolo | | |
| 1941–1943 | Casale | 45 | (6) |
| 1943–1944 | Asti | | |

International career
| 1932 | Italy B | 3 | (0) |
- * Club domestic league appearances and goals

Lorenzo "Renzo" Gazzari (7 January 1907 in Hvar – 1998 in Florence) was an Italian footballer who played as a defender.

== Career ==
Gazzari played a total of 152 matches for HNK Hajduk Split between 1921 and 1928, 10 of which came in the Yugoslav Championship, and helped the club win its first national championship in 1927. Next, he moved, along his brother Otmar to Trieste to play for U.S. Triestina Calcio where he was spotted by the AC Fiorentina´s scouts. He continued his career in Florence where he made an astonishing career becoming one of the most influential defenders of the club in the 1930s, and having capped three times for the Italian B national team. He was mostly known as left full-back, playing equally well with both of his legs. After ending his playing career, he dedicated to tennis, having become a tennis coach.

Lorenzo Gazzari played three games for the Italian B national team, all in 1932.

== External sources ==
- Stats from Italy at enciclopediadelcalcio.it
- Profile at Nogometni Leksikon. (in Croatian)
- Profile at MyJuve
- Lorenzo Gazzari at ATF-Firenze.it
