= Tihoslav Tošić =

Serbian civil engineer and industrial manager (1936–2019)

- Born: June 4, 1936; Belgrade, Kingdom of Yugoslavia
- Died: January 3, 2019 (aged 82); Belgrade, Republic of Serbia
- Occupations: Civil engineer; industrial manager
- Known for: Director of Goša industrial complex; President of INEX
- Honours: Order of Labour with Golden Wreath (1977), Medal of Labour (1972)

Tihoslav "Tića" Tošić (1936–2019) was a Serbian civil engineer and industrial manager who served as general director of the Goša industrial complex in Smederevska Palanka and later as president of the Yugoslav foreign-trade association INEX. During his tenure at Goša the company participated in major industrial and infrastructure projects across the Socialist Federal Republic of Yugoslavia. His career and contributions to Yugoslav industrial engineering were later summarised in the professional engineering journal Structural Integrity and Life.

== Early life and education ==
Tihoslav Tošić was born on June 4th, 1936, in Belgrade, into a family of civil engineers. His father, Dragomir Tošić (1909-1985), was a civil engineer and a football player for the Yugoslavian national football team, and his grandfather, Tiosav Tošić (1870-1951), was a hydraulic engineer.

Tihoslav completed his school education in Belgrade before enrolling at the Faculty of Civil Engineering at the University of Belgrade. He received a scholarship from Goša during his studies. He specialised in structural engineering with a focus on metal constructions and graduated in 1961.

He began his professional career in the Yugoslav construction and steel-structure industry during the period of post-war industrial development.

== Career ==
=== Goša industrial complex ===
Tošić spent most of his professional career at the Goša industrial complex in Smederevska Palanka, one of the largest Yugoslav enterprises specializing in steel structures and heavy industry. Between 1975 and 1985 he served as general director of the company in three consecutive terms, a period during which Goša participated in major infrastructure projects across Yugoslavia as well as export.

Tošić participated in infrastructure projects including Gazela Bridge, Branko’s Bridge and the new railway bridge over the Sava in Belgrade, as well as the Bajina Bašta and Đerdap hydroelectric projects.

These results lead to the enterprise receiving the highest national decoration the AVNOJ-prize in 1983.

During his tenure, President Josip Broz Tito visited the Goša industrial complex, reflecting the importance of the enterprise within the Yugoslav industrial system.

=== Presidency of INEX ===
From 1985 to 1989, Tošić became president of the business association INEX (later SOUR INEX), a major Yugoslav foreign-trade organization involved in international commercial and industrial cooperation.

=== International trade activities ===
From 1990 to 1992 he worked within the INEX system abroad and served as director of the Yugoslav trade company INEXAMER in New York City, representing Yugoslav industrial interests in international markets.

Between 1996 and 2001, Tošić directed YUCHI d.o.o. in Belgrade, a company focused on economic cooperation between Yugoslavia and the People's Republic of China. He also served as an authorized representative of the Yugoslav Chamber of Commerce in China.

== Honours and Awards ==
Tošić was the recipient of the Yugoslavian Medal of Labour (1972) and the Order of Labour with the Golden Wreath (1977). In recognition of his lifetime achievements in industry he was awarded the Charter with Plaque of the University of Belgrade (1989). Tošić was the recipient of the October Prize ("Oktobarska Nagrada") of Smederevska Palanka.

== Legacy ==
Tihoslav Tošić recorded his professional experiences in detailed diaries, providing insights into Yugoslavia’s industrial operations during his career. These records were published in two books under the series "Diary of a Director" (Dnevnik jednog direktora, Ekonomski Institut, Belgrade, 2010) and document his role in the development of infrastructure and his approach to industrial leadership. His accounts were quoted in several news articles and blogs.

His collection, containing further testimonies from the time of former Yugoslavia, is available in the Archives of Yugoslavia.

As director of GOŠA, Tošić supported the establishment of the International Fracture Mechanics Summer School (IFMASS); the school later came under the auspices of the Society for Structural Integrity and Life (DIVK), established in 2001. His career and contributions to Yugoslav industrial engineering were summarized in an obituary published in the society's engineering journal Structural Integrity and Life, which highlighted his leadership in the development of steel-construction and industrial production in Yugoslavia.

== Publications ==
- Tošić, Tihoslav (2007). Tehnologija proizvodnje čeličnih konstrukcija. Belgrade: Građevinska knjiga. ISBN 978-86-395-0516-5.
- Tošić, Tihoslav (2010). Dnevnik jednog direktora: Razvoj kao izazov. Belgrade: Ekonomski institut. ISBN 978-86-7329-077-5.
- Tošić, Tihoslav (2010). Dnevnik jednog direktora II: Novi izazovi. Belgrade: Ekonomski institut.
- Tošić, Tihoslav (2012). Cevovod pod pritiskom za RHE „Bajina Bašta“. Belgrade: Društvo za Integritet i Vek Konstrukcija.
