= Jovan Beleslin =

Yugoslav footballer (born 1919)

Personal information
- Date of birth: 1 October 1919
- Place of birth: Szőreg, Hungarian Republic
- Position: Defender

Senior career*
Years	Team	Apps	(Gls)
1937–1938	ŽAK Subotica		
1938–1939	BSK	2	(0)
1945	Partizan	0	(0)
1947	Red Star Belgrade	1	(0)
1948–1949	Spartak Subotica	11	(0)
1949–1950	Milicionar		

International career
1939	Yugoslavia	1	(0)
- * Club domestic league appearances and goals

Jovan Beleslin (Serbian Cyrillic: Јован Белеслин; born 1 October 1919) was a Yugoslav footballer.

== Club career ==
A strong full-back with excellent header, he started playing with ŽAK Subotica when he got registered for the senior team in May 1937. He won the 1938–39 Yugoslav Football Championship with BSK. After World War II, he played for Spartak Subotica and Belgrade clubs Red Star, Partizan and Milicionar where in 1950 he finished his career as a player/manager.

== Managerial career ==
Beleslin played one match for the Yugoslavia national football team, on 12 November 1939 in a friendly match against Hungary (a 2–0 loss) in Belgrade.

Beleslin was also a football referee between 1952 and 1968.
