= Franjo Glaser =

Croatian footballer and manager

Personal information
- Date of birth: 7 January 1913
- Place of birth: Sarajevo, Austro-Hungary
- Date of death: 1 March 2003 (aged 90)
- Place of death: Zagreb, Croatia
- Position: Goalkeeper

Senior career*
Years	Team	Apps	(Gls)
1929–1930	Hajduk Sarajevo		
1930–1932	Slavija Osijek		
1932–1937	BSK	46	(0)
1937–1940	Građanski Zagreb	43	(0)
1945–1947	Partizan	16	(0)
1947–1949	Mornar Split		

International career
1933–1940	Yugoslavia	35	(0)
1940–1944	Croatia	11	(0)

Managerial career
- 1945–1946: Partizan
- 1947–1948: Kvarner Rijeka
- 1948–1949: Mornar Split
- 1949–1950: Kvarner Rijeka
- 1950–1953: Vardar
- 1954–1956: Rijeka
- 1968–1970: NK Zagreb
- Borac Banja Luka
- Sloga Doboj
- Trešnjevka
- Rudar Breza
- Bratstvo Novi Travnik
- Klagenfurt
- Velež Mostar
- Sartid Smederevo
- * Club domestic league appearances and goals

Franjo Glaser (alternatively Glazer; 7 January 1913 – 1 March 2003) was a Croatian football goalkeeper and football manager. He is the only Yugoslav footballer who won national titles before and after the Second World War, with three clubs BSK Belgrade, Građanski Zagreb and FK Partizan.

== Club career ==
Glaser was born in Sarajevo. He started playing for SK Hajduk Sarajevo having debuted for their first team being only 15. He was Hajduk goalkeeper in their games in the 1930 Yugoslav Cup. In 1930 he moved to NK Slavija Osijek where he will play until 1933 when he moved to BSK. With BSK he made an immediate impact becoming the club's main goalkeeper, and already that year he became a national team player, as well. He played with BSK between 1933 and 1937 winning the Yugoslav championship on two occasions, in 1935 and 1936, and playing a total of 269 matches with the club.

In summer 1936 he was considered guilty by the court in Belgrade of the drowning of one boy in the Sava river resort. The episode affected Glaser and ended up being decisive in his to move to another giant of Yugoslav football, Zagreb's HŠK Građanski. He acquired an almost a legendary status there. He restored his place as the national team main goalkeeper, and with Građanski he will win another Yugoslav championship in 1940 as well as the Croatian championship in 1943. He played a total of 623 games for Građanski.

After the end of the Second World War, Federal People's Republic of Yugoslavia was formed, he signed with Partizan where he won another Yugoslav title in 1947. After that season, he became simultaneously coach and goalkeeper of NK Mornar Split, where he will stay until 1949.

Between 1933 and 1949 he played a total of 1,225 matches. He also has defended 73 of 94 penalties he stood against.

== International career ==
While playing for BSK and Građanski Glaser was the regular goalkeeper of the Yugoslavia national team having earned a total of 35 caps. His debut was on 3 April 1933 in a friendly match against Spain, 1–1 draw, and his fairway was in a friendly played on 3 November 1940 against Germany, 2–0 win.

After the invasion of Yugoslavia, Glaser played further eleven matches for the Croatia national team, all four matches that Banovina Croatia played, and seven matches for the Independent State of Croatia. His final international was an April 1944 friendly match against Slovakia.

== Coaching career and retirement ==
When coming to the newly formed FK Partizan in 1945 Glaser beside their goalkeeper became their first manager. However that year the league has not been yet reestablished and by the end of the year he was replaced by the Hungarian Illés Spitz. He stayed in Belgrade until 1947, but when he moved to Mornar Split he would experience again the feeling of being a manager/player. This early coaching experiences proved to be an excellent way of gaining experience, and Glaser later managed numerous clubs, such as NK Dinamo Zagreb, NK Kvarner Rijeka, NK Proleter Osijek, FK Borac Banja Luka, NK Trešnjevka, Austria FC Klagenfurt (today's FC Kärnten) and FK Sartid Smederevo, among others.

He spent his final years at a retirement home in Zagreb. He is buried in Mirogoj Cemetery.

== Honours ==
=== Player ===
BSK

- Yugoslav Football Championship: 1935, 1936
- Yugoslav Cup: 1934

Građanski Zagreb

- Yugoslav Football Championship: 1939-40
- Banovina of Croatia First League: 1940
- ISC First League: 1941, 1943

Partizan

- Yugoslav First League: 1946–47
- Yugoslav Cup: 1947
