= František Koželuh =

Czech footballer (1885–1946)

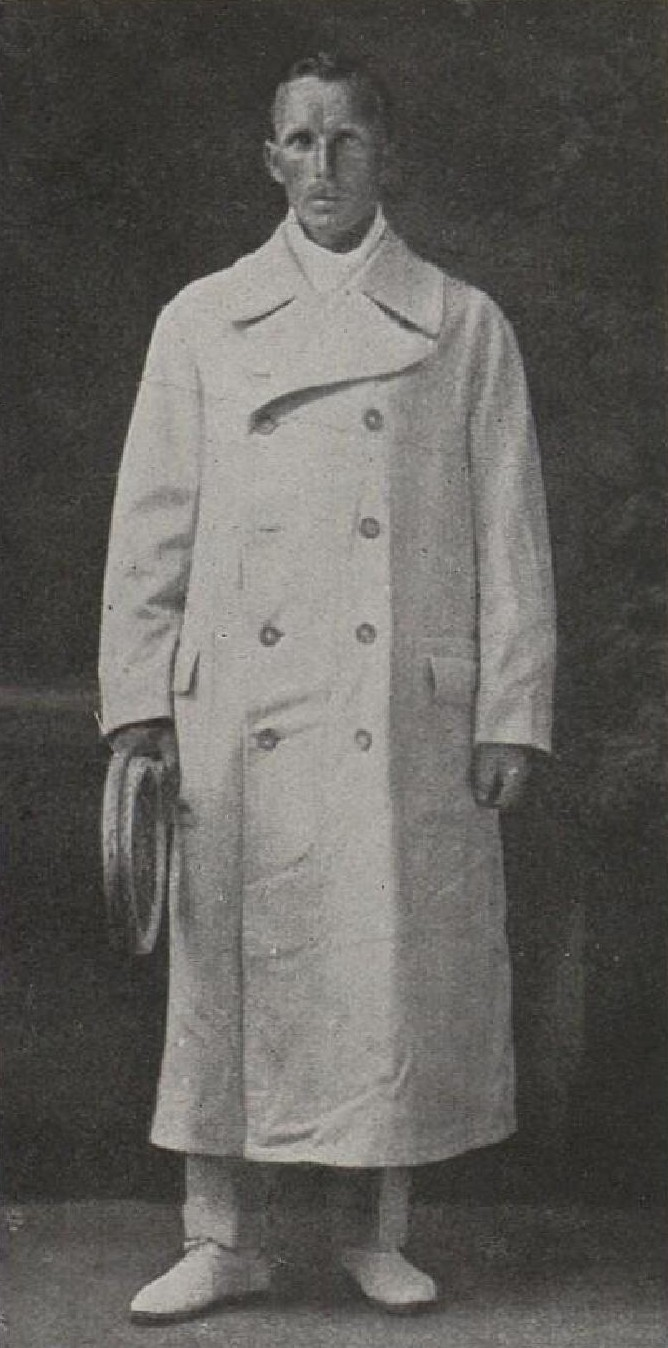

Personal information
- Date of birth: 3 July 1885
- Place of birth: Prague, Austro-Hungary
- Date of death: 12 March 1946 (aged 60)

Senior career*
Years	Team	Apps	(Gls)
1915–1916	Sparta Prague		
1923	Sparta Prague		

Managerial career
- 1905–1911: Sparta Prague (assistant)
- 1911–1912: Cracovia
- 1912–1915: HAŠK
- 1924: Cracovia
- 1926: Cracovia
- 1928–1929: Polonia Warsaw
- 1929: Wisła Kraków
- * Club domestic league appearances and goals

František Koželuh (3 July 1885 – 12 March 1946) was a Czech football player and manager.

== Club career ==
Koželuh played most of his playing career in Prague with Sparta.

== Coaching career ==
He started as assistant of John William Madden at Sparta Prague between 1905 and 1911. Then, he coached Sparta Prague in the 1911–12 season. Later, he moved abroad, to Yugoslavia, where he coached Croatian side HAŠK between 1912 and 1915. Next he coached Polish side Wisła Kraków between 1929 and 1934.

== Honours ==
HAŠK

- Croatian Football League: 1912
