= August Lešnik =

Croatian footballer

Personal information
- Date of birth: 16 July 1914
- Place of birth: Zagreb, Austria-Hungary
- Date of death: 24 February 1992 (aged 77)
- Place of death: Zagreb, Croatia
- Position: Forward

Senior career*
Years	Team	Apps	(Gls)
1929–1934	HŠK Derby Zagreb		
1934–1936	HŠK Šparta Zagreb		
1936–1945	Građanski Zagreb	144	(181)
1945–1946	Dinamo Zagreb	2	(4)
1946–1948	Dubrava		
1948–1949	Dinamo Zagreb	1	(0)

International career
1937–1940	Yugoslavia	10	(4)
1940	Banovina of Croatia	3	(0)
1941–1943	Independent State of Croatia	6	(0)
- * Club domestic league appearances and goals

August Lešnik (Croatian pronunciation: [ǎuɡust lêʃnik]; 16 July 1914 – 24 February 1992) was a Croatian footballer. Lešnik played most of his club football for Građanski Zagreb. In 1941 he was the Croatian First League's top scorer while playing for Građanski, and performed the same feat twice in the Yugoslavian First League as well: in 1938 and 1939. He played for the Yugoslavia football team in the late 1930s and the Croatia national team from 1940 to 1944.

== Club career ==
Lešnik started his career in 1929 playing for local club HŠK Derby. He spent there five years, and after that had a short spell in HŠK Šparta Zagreb. In 1936 Lešnik started playing for Građanski Zagreb, the club where spent most of his career. In the first four years at Građanski, he was twice the top goalscorer of Yugoslav First League. In the 1937–38 season he scored 17 goals in 18 matches, and the following season 22 goals in as many games. He clinched two titles with Građanski in 1937 and 1940, and one of his most famous club matches occurred in spring 1937 against BSK in Belgrade in which Lešnik scored a hat-trick in the first seven minutes of the game.

In 1936, Lešnik scored three goals in an exhibition match against Liverpool F.C. which Građanski won 5–1.

After World War II, Građanski was disbanded by the communist Yugoslav authorities, and Lešnik finished his career with the newly formed Dinamo Zagreb.

== International career ==
Lešnik made his debut for Yugoslavia in a May 1937 friendly match away against Hungary and earned a total of 10 caps, scoring 4 goals. He played his other 9 games for the unofficial team of the Banovina of Croatia and under the flag of the Independent State of Croatia, a World War II-era puppet state of Nazi Germany. His final international was an April 1944 friendly against Slovakia.

== Style of play ==
Lešnik had a natural instinct for goal and was very crafty and adept in using the opportunities to score; he was humorously described as being able to "score four goals out of two chances". Despite his abilities, he remained a controversial player due to an apparent absence of interest or effort in many games; it was often said that his kit remained white and spotless even in the muddiest of conditions. Lešnik did not like to train either: he trained only on Fridays, while his teammates trained three times a week. By his own admission, he used his left foot "only for walking". Nevertheless, Lešnik was famed for his sudden sprinting bursts, usually close to goal, and his agility and execution were unmatched by any Dinamo player until generations later, by strikers such as Dražan Jerković and Davor Šuker.

== Bibliography ==
- Bojanić, Živko; Slobodan Jovanović (2007). Gol(a) istina - Kraljevi strelaca. Klasa d.o.o. ISBN 978-86-85627-06-4.
