= 1932 Yugoslav Football Championship =

Yugoslav Football Championship
- Season: 1932
- Dates: 11 September – 6 November
- Champions: Concordia (2nd title)
- Top goalscorer: Svetislav Valjarević (10)

The 1932 Yugoslav Football Championship (Serbo-Croato-Slovenian: Državno prvenstvo 1932 / Државно првенство 1932) was the 10th season of Kingdom of Yugoslavia's premier football competition.

A surprising revert to the cup system, presumably to test out how a double-match cup will work (as the previous cups have been single game eliminations).

== Bracket ==
Quarter-finals
Concordia	3	3	6
Viktorija Zagreb	0	0	0
SK Jugoslavija	5	4	9
Vojvodina	2	2	4
Hajduk Split	3	2	5
Građanski Zagreb	0	2	2
BSK	3	3	6
BASK	1	1	2

Semi-finals
Concordia	0	6	6
SK Jugoslavija	0	1	1
Hajduk Split	0	3	3
BSK	0	0	0

Final
Concordia	2	2	4
Hajduk Split	1	1	2

== Winning squad ==
Champions:

Concordia Zagreb (coach: Bogdan Cuvaj)

- Sergije Demić
- Pavičić
- Ivan Belošević
- Boško Ralić
- Đuka Agić
- Pavao Löw
- Egidio Martinović
- Nikola Babić
- Svetislav Valjarević
- Slavko Kodrnja
- Zvonko Jazbec
- Lolić

== Top scorers ==
Final goalscoring position, number of goals, player/players and club.

- 1 - 10 goals - Svetislav Valjarević (Concordia)
- 2 - 4 goals - Nikola Babić (Concordia), Leo Lemešić (Hajduk Split)
