= Svetislav Glišović =

Serbian footballer and manager

Personal information
- Date of birth: 17 September 1913
- Place of birth: Belgrade, Kingdom of Serbia
- Date of death: 10 March 1988 (aged 74)
- Place of death: Paris, France
- Position: Midfielder

Senior career*
Years	Team	Apps	(Gls)
1930–1940	BSK	114	(41)
1946–1947	Stade Français	2	(0)

International career
1932–1940	Kingdom of Yugoslavia	21	(9)

Managerial career
- 1945: FS Serbia
- 1946–1948: Red Star Belgrade
- 1953–1958: Panathinaikos
- 1958: Grasshoppers
- 1959–1961: Aris
- 1961–?: Ukrainian Nationals
- 1966–1967: Aris
- * Club domestic league appearances and goals

Svetislav Glišović (Serbian Cyrillic: Светислав Глишовић; 17 September 1913 – 10 March 1988) was a Yugoslav international football player and manager.

== Club career ==
Glišović played in the youth team of SK Soko before becoming one of the main players of the BSK golden 1930s, he was, together with Tirnanić, Vujadinović, Marjanović and Božović, the main contributor to the attacking game of the club. Since his first appearance in the 1932 season, he won four national championships, and was the league top scorer, with ten goals in same number of matches, in the 1939–40 season. He spent a decade in the club, playing in both sides in the midfield and becoming famous for his speed and strong shot.

== International career ==
Beside the 15 matches played for the Belgrade City selection, and three matches for the B national team, Glišović played an impressive 21 matches for the Yugoslavia national football team, having scored nine times. His debut was on 5 June 1932 in Belgrade against France, and his last match was on 14 April 1940 against Germany in Vienna.

== Managerial career ==
In the first national Championship after the Second World War in 1945 the competition was organised by the selections of the six republics forming the new SFR Yugoslavia plus the Yugoslav Army team. Glišović was in charge as coach of the winning SR Serbia team. From the next season the championship was held normally, with clubs competing, and he was named the head coach of the Red Star Belgrade team, where he stayed for two years until 1948.

Afterwards, he continued his managerial career in Greece, Switzerland and the United States.

== Honours ==
BSK

- Yugoslav First League: 1933, 1935, 1936, 1938–39

Individual

- Yugoslav First League top scorer : 1939–40
