= Dragomir Tošić =

Civil Engineer and Yugoslav footballer

Dragan Tošić
Personal information
- Full name: Dragomir Tošić
- Date of birth: November 8, 1909
- Place of birth: Belgrade, Kingdom of Serbia
- Date of death: June 20, 1985 (aged 75)
- Place of death: Belgrade, SFR Yugoslavia
- Position: Defender

Senior career*
Years	Team	Apps	(Gls)
1928–1933	BSK	47	(0)

International career
1930–1934	Yugoslavia	11	(0)
- * Club domestic league appearances and goals

Dragomir "Dragan" Tošić (8 November 1909 – 20 June 1985) was a Yugoslav and Serbian civil engineer and previously football player.

== Early life ==
Dragomir Tošić was born on 8 November 1909 in Belgrade, Kingdom of Serbia as the fourth child to Tiosav and Lukrecija Tošić. His father, Tiosav Tošić (1870–1951) was a prominent civil engineer and technical director of the Belgrade Waterworks.

In 1928, he graduated with honors from the Sixth Real Gymnasium in Belgrade. His graduation essay, "Youth Without Ideals is a Weak Hope for its Nation" ("Mladost bez ideala slaba je nada svome narodu"), was awarded by the notable by the notable newspaper "Politika", which subsequently published it.

== Football career ==
Dragomir Tošić began his football career in 1925 when he joined the youth team of BSK (Belgrade Sports Club). By 1929, he had progressed to the club's first team as a left back, earning recognition for his sharp technical skills, excellent positional play, and reputation as a relentless and strong defender.

He made his debut for the Yugoslavia national football team in 1930 and was selected for the squad that represented the country at the inaugural 1930 FIFA World Cup in Montevideo, Uruguay. His first appearance in the national jersey was on August 3, 1930, during a friendly match against Argentina, where he replaced Dr. Ivković. Between 1930 and 1934, he earned 11 caps for Yugoslavia, facing teams such as Argentina, Bulgaria, Portugal, France, Czechoslovakia, Poland, Spain, and Switzerland.

During his time with BSK, Tošić formed a strong defensive duo with Predrag "Pegi" Radovanović contributing to BSK's successes, including winning the Yugoslav championship in the 1930/31 and 1932/33 seasons. This period marked the beginning of BSK's dominance in Yugoslav football, as the club secured five championship titles in seven years. Tošić retired from competitive football in 1935, having played approximately 300 matches for BSK.

After his playing career, Tošić remained actively involved in football. He coached Borac Čačak from 1935 to 1941 and qualified as a federal football referee. Between 1949 and 1959, he held key roles within the Football Association of Yugoslavia (FSJ), serving as the youth national team coach and secretary of the FSJ Technical Committee. He also served as a technical official in the Yugoslavia squad at the 1958 Summer Olympics in Melbourne, where the team finished in second place.

In recognition of his outstanding contributions to football and sports in Serbia, he was awarded the Football Association of Yugoslavia (FSJ) Gold Plaque in 1959. In 1982 he received the 85th-anniversary golden medal of the Serbian Football Association and was declared a "distinguished football official" and was granted a credential allowing him to attend all games in Serbia free of charge.

== Civil engineering career ==
Dragomir Tošić graduated in civil engineering at the University of Belgrade in 1934, while being an active football player. During his professional career he designed and constructed railway lines, tunnels, and hydroelectric power plants. He was the founder and, from 1951 to 1959, the general director of the construction company "Tunelogradnja." For the achievements of this organization, including the breakthrough of the 6.171 m long Sozina tunnel (the longest in Montenegro) and other projects, he was awarded the Order of Labor with a Golden Wreath in 1957.

In the period between 1961 and 1965 he served as a United Nations engineering expert and worked on the development of rail- and roadways in Ethiopia. Between 1967 and 1970 he worked on the development of roads in the Democratic Republic of Congo (DRC) as well as a bridge across the Wamba River.

Upon his return in 1970 he continued his engineering work in Belgrade's "Hidroprojekt" and was involved in international projects in Libya, Syria and Tunesia. He retired in 1974 and lived in Belgrade until his passing.

== Personal life ==
Dragomir Tošić married Smilja Ristić in 1935, and the couple had four children: sons Tihoslav (1936) and Mihailo (1938), and daughters Milena (1941) and Ljubinka (1947). His son Tihoslav followed in his footsteps, becoming a civil engineer and continuing the family tradition. Mihailo was a notable journalist and a co-founder of the "Dadov" teater in Belgrade. He is survived by his Daughter Ljubinka (Bubina), Grandsons Igor Tošić, Igor Leuchter, and Mihailo Tošić, Granddaughters Zoe Smilja Leuchster, and Tamara Tošić, and Great-Grandchildren, Ana Katarina and Filip Jakov Tošić, Ilya Leuchter, Alexis Leuchter, and Sofia Leuchter .

In addition to Serbian, Dragomir Tošić was fluent in German, French, Romanian, English and Spanish.
