= Pablo Gazzarri =

Argentine priest

Father Pablo Gazzarri was an ordained priest who worked in the Parish of Nuestra Señora del Carmen de Villa Urquiza (Buenos Aires) who was abducted on November 27, 1976; being the fifth anniversary of his ordination. He was tortured and killed by his abductors.

Father Gazzarri had an intense political commitment that led him to join the group descamisados. According to witnesses, he was intercepted on the street near his parents' home by people wearing police uniforms. The prisoner was seen at the School of Mechanical Engineering of the Navy and was "moved" in the first days of January 1977. According to the survivor Ralil Lisandro Cubas, Father Gazzarri was brutally tortured at the ESMA.

In 2002, the Legislature of the City of Buenos Aires Gazzarri honored the Father.
