= Pavao Löw =

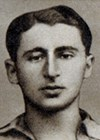
- Born: 1910; Zagreb, Austria-Hungary
- Died: 1 January 1986 (aged 75–76); Dubrovnik, SR Croatia, SFR Yugoslavia
- Relatives: Alfred (father); Malvina (mother); Elza (sister)

Pavao Löw (1910 – 1 January 1986) was a football player in the Kingdom of Yugoslavia and later an officer in the Yugoslav People's Army.

Before World War II he was a prominent member of Makabi, a famous Jewish club. With HŠK Concordia, he won two national championships in 1930 and 1932. In 1933, he played three games for the Yugoslavia national football team.

During the war he was arrested on 21 June 1941 and brought to Slano camp on Pag. In August, he was transferred to Jasenovac camp. He fled in September 1943 and joined the partisans. He later joined the communist party. In 1944 he was reassigned to work with foreign missions.

After the war, he changed his name to Pavle Levković and worked as a Major in Yugoslav People's Army in the commission for determining the crimes of the occupiers and their collaborators. From 1963 to 1964 he was the General Secretary of FK Partizan in Belgrade. He later left Belgrade for health reasons and moved to Dubrovnik. He died there on 1 January 1986.
