= 1927 Yugoslav Football Championship =

Yugoslav Championship
- Season: 1927
- Champions: Hajduk Split (1st title)
- Mitropa Cup: Hajduk Split; BSK Belgrade
- Goals scored: 71
- Average goals/game: 4.73
- Top goalscorer: Kuzman Sotirović (6)

The 1927 National Championship (Serbo-Croato-Slovenian: Državno prvenstvo 1927. / Државно првенство 1927.) was the first year in which the championship was played in a league system, with Hajduk Split being the first national league champion. Newcomer BSK Beograd replaced Jugoslavija Beograd as Serbia's top-performing club, this was due to half of the Jugoslavija players switching clubs to play for BSK. Hajduk and second-place club BSK entered the 1927 Mitropa Cup.

== Qualifiers ==
For the final stage of the national championship, the clubs were qualified through their subassociation competitions, although this year, the major subassociations of Belgrade and Zagreb gave each two teams for the qualifying stage, qualifying the subassociation champions directly, while the second placed will participate in a qualifying round. Hajduk Split also qualified directly as Cup winner, while the champions of the rest of the subassociations played the qualifying round.

The representatives were:

- Subassociation of Belgrade: BSK Belgrade (qualified directly) and SK Jugoslavija
- Subassociation of Zagreb: HAŠK (qualified directly) and Građanski Zagreb
- Subassociation of Ljubljana: Ilirija
- Subassociation of Osijek: Hajduk Osijek
- Subassociation of Sarajevo: SAŠK
- Subassociation of Split: Hajduk Split
- Subassociation of Subotica: SAND Subotica

Qualifying round:

- Ljubljana, May 26: Ilirija – Građanski 5:0
- Sarajevo, May 29: SAŠK – Jugoslavija 2:1
- Osijek, May 29: Hajduk Osijek – SAND 2:2

The qualified teams were Ilirija, SAŠK and SAND. The elimination of Građanski and Jugoslavija, both former national champions, was a major surprise. The qualification was played only in one round. As Hajduk Osijek and SAND ended tied in their match, an additional match between them was played in Osijek on May 30 which qualified SAND.

== League table ==
Pos	Team	Pld	W	D	L	GF	GA	GR	Pts	Qualification
1	Hajduk Split (C)	5	4	0	1	15	6	2.500	8	Qualification for Mitropa Cup
2	BSK Belgrade	5	3	0	2	17	16	1.063	6	Qualification for Mitropa Cup
3	HAŠK Zagreb	5	2	1	2	11	15	0.733	5	
4	SAND Subotica	5	2	0	3	11	12	0.917	4	
5	SAŠK Sarajevo	5	2	0	3	12	13	0.923	4	
6	Ilirija Ljubljana	5	1	1	3	5	9	0.556	3	

Source: rsssf.org
(C) Champions

== Results ==
Home \ Away	BSK	HAJ	HŠK	ILI	SND	SAŠ
BSK Belgrade				3–2	3–1	7–4
Hajduk Split	5–1			3–0		2–0
HAŠK	4–3	0–4				3–2
Ilirija Ljubljana			1–1		1–0	
SAND Subotica		5–1	5–3			0–4
SAŠK Sarajevo				2–1		

Source: DataSoccer.it
Legend: Blue = home team win; Yellow = draw; Red = away team win.

== Top scorers ==
Final goalscoring position, number of goals, player/players and club.

- 1 - 6 goals - Kuzman Sotirović (BSK Belgrade)
- 2 - 4 goals - Antun Bonačić, Vinko Radić (both Hajduk Split), Branko Zinaja (HAŠK)

== Winning squad ==
Champions:

HAJDUK SPLIT (coach: Luka Kaliterna)

- Otmar Gazzari
- Renzo Gazzari
- Ivan Montana
- Miroslav Dešković
- Mihovil Borovčić Kurir
- Veljko Poduje
- Šime Poduje
- Leo Lemešić
- Mirko Bonačić
- Antun Bonačić
- Vinko Radić
- Petar Borovčić Kurir

== See also ==
- Yugoslav Cup
- Yugoslav League Championship
- Football Association of Yugoslavia
