= Nikola Simić (footballer, born 1897) =

Serbian footballer

Personal information
- Full name: Nikola Simić
- Date of birth: 2 December 1897
- Place of birth: Belgrade, Kingdom of Serbia
- Date of death: 22 December 1969 (aged 72)
- Place of death: Belgrade, SR Serbia, SFR Yugoslavia
- Position: Midfielder

Youth career
- 1911–191x: BSK

Senior career*
Years	Team	Apps	(Gls)
191x–1914	BSK		
- Nice
- Monaco
- Marseille
- Grenoble
- Lyon
- Toulouse
- Oxford
1919–1925	BSK		

International career
1920	Kingdom of Serbs, Croats and Slovenes	1	(0)

Managerial career
- 1931–1932: BSK
- 1936: Yugoslavia
- * Club domestic league appearances and goals

Nikola Simić (Serbian Cyrillic: Никола Симић; 2 December 1897 – 22 December 1969) was a Serbian football player and manager. He was one of the first "stars" of the first generation of Serbian footballers and played over 100 official matches for BSK. He was the coach of the Yugoslavia national team in 1936.

== Biography ==
Born in Belgrade, he studied in the School of Theology at Bogoslovija. In 1911 he joined the youth team of BSK and later debuted for the first team. In the winter of 1915–16, during World War I he left Serbia in the Serbian army's retreat through Albania. He moved to France where he continued his studies and played in OGC Nice, Monaco, Marseille, Grenoble, Lyon and Toulouse. He also played half season with Oxford in England.

At the end of the war, he returned to Belgrade, now the capital of the Kingdom of Serbs, Croats and Slovenes (renamed to Yugoslavia in 1929) and rejoined his former team BSK in 1919. He became one of the best players of the Blues, known for his excellent technical skills, and even became team captain. After retiring in 1925, for many years he was member of the club direction.

He played 10 matches for the Belgrade Football Subassociation team, and he was part of the first Yugoslavia national team squad which was gathered to play in the 1920 Summer Olympics having played the second match against Egypt on 2 September 1920.

After retiring he was in charge of the football sectioned od BSK in three periods: 1926–1932, 1933–1936 and 1941–1942. He was also the coach of the Belgrade Football Subassociation team, and in 1936 for a short period he was the main coach of the Yugoslavia national team.
