= Đorđe Vujadinović =

Serbian footballer and manager

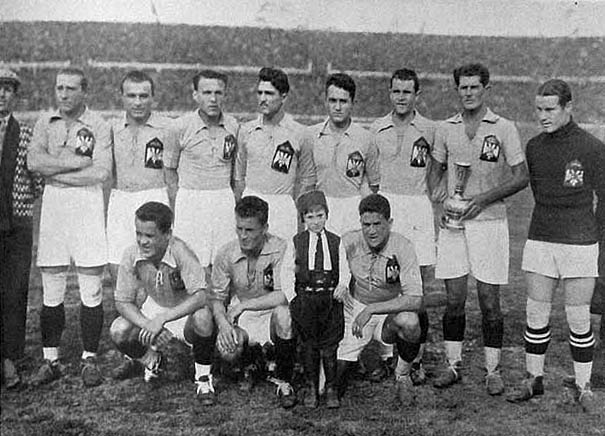

Personal information
- Full name: Đorđe Vujadinović
- Date of birth: 6 December 1909
- Place of birth: Smederevo, Kingdom of Serbia
- Date of death: 5 October 1990 (aged 80)
- Place of death: Belgrade, SFR Yugoslavia
- Height: 1.73 m (5 ft 8 in)
- Position: Forward

Youth career
- 1923–1928: BSK

Senior career*
Years	Team	Apps	(Gls)
1928–1940	BSK	129	(89)

International career
1929–1940	Kingdom of Yugoslavia	44	(18)

Managerial career
- 1953–1956: Partizan (youth)
- 1956–1960: OFK Beograd (youth)
- 1960–1961: OFK Beograd
- 1963–1965: Yugoslavia U21
- 1967: Altay
- 1967–1973: Voždovac
- * Club domestic league appearances and goals

Đorđe Vujadinović (Serbian Cyrillic: Ђорђе Вујадиновић; 6 December 1909 – 5 October 1990) was a Yugoslav international football player and manager.

== Club career ==
He was born in Kolari, a suburb of Smederevo. While playing football with his friends in a sandy field in the Kalemegdan Park in the center of the city, he was spotted by an "older serious man with hat" who invite him, together with other two boys, to come and make tests in, the biggest club from that period, BSK. He passed, and joined the youth team, in which played with a generation of players, which included Tirnanić, Valjarević, Krčevinac, Zloković and he made the forward line, the team that won many Championships in the 1930s. Those late 1920s were years of great expansion in the Yugoslav Kingdom and football was starting to be extremely popular. In those times, the players started to be professionalized and started to be paid monetarily, but he refused, saying that his earnings as a bank employee were enough for him and that he played football only by pleasure. Until 1940 he played about 400 matches for the club, was national Champion five times and twice a league top-scorer.

He was the only BSK player to win all five national titles.

== International career ==
Before the World War II, the Yugoslav team was unimaginable without him in the squad. Between 1929 and 1940 he played 44 international matches, and did not play more because of his duties as a bank functionary. He was one of the main players of the Yugoslavia national football team in the 1930 FIFA World Cup, and scored a total of 18 goals for the national team. His final international was a November 1940 friendly match against Nazi Germany.

=== International goals ===
Yugoslavia's goal tally first

#	Date	Venue	Opponent	Score	Result	Competition
1	26 January 1930	Leoforos Alexandras Stadium, Athens, Greece	Greece	1–0	1–2	1929–31 Balkan Cup
2	13 April 1930	BSK Stadion, Belgrade, Yugoslavia	Bulgaria	1–0	6–1	Friendly
3	13 April 1930	BSK Stadion, Belgrade, Yugoslavia	Bulgaria	5–1	6–1	Friendly
4	17 July 1930	Estadio Gran Parque Central, Montevideo, Uruguay	Bolivia	4–0	4–0	1930 FIFA World Cup
5	27 July 1930	Estadio Centenario, Montevideo, Uruguay	Uruguay	1–0	1–6	1930 FIFA World Cup
6	24 April 1932	Estadio Buenavista, Oviedo, Spain	Spain	1–2	1–2	Friendly
7	3 May 1932	Estádio do Campo Grande, Lisbon, Portugal	Portugal	1–1	2–3	Friendly
8	3 May 1932	Estádio do Campo Grande, Lisbon, Portugal	Portugal	2–3	2–3	Friendly
9	26 June 1932	BSK Stadion, Belgrade, Yugoslavia	Greece	5–1	7–1	1932 Balkan Cup
10	3 July 1932	BSK Stadion, Belgrade, Yugoslavia	Romania	3–1	3–1	1932 Balkan Cup
11	10 September 1933	Polish Army Stadium, Warsaw, Poland	Poland	1–1	3–4	Friendly
12	10 September 1933	Polish Army Stadium, Warsaw, Poland	Poland	2–1	3–4	Friendly
13	16 December 1934	Parc des Princes, Paris, France	France	2–1	2–3	Friendly
14	20 June 1935	Yunak Stadium, Sofia, Bulgaria	Greece	3–1	6–1	1935 Balkan Cup
15	24 June 1935	Yunak Stadium, Sofia, Bulgaria	Bulgaria	2–1	3–3	1935 Balkan Cup
16	24 June 1935	Yunak Stadium, Sofia, Bulgaria	Bulgaria	3–3	3–3	1935 Balkan Cup
17	10 May 1935	ONEF Stadium, Bucharest, Romania	Romania	1–1	2–3	1935 King Carol Cup
18	6 September 1937	BSK Stadion, Belgrade, Yugoslavia	Romania	1–1	2–1	Friendly

== Managerial career ==
After returning from captivity, in the end of the Second World War, he ended his playing career and dedicates to the work with the younger generations. He starts coaching the youth teams of FK Partizan and latter OFK Beograd, where he also managed the senior team in 1960–61. He was also the manager of the Yugoslavia national under-21 football team and Altay S.K. While in a zenith of his managerial time, he invited Mr. Miljan Miljanić (the latter President of the Yugoslav Football Federation), and with who had already worked before, to substitute him in the job.

== Honours ==
BSK

- Yugoslav First League: 1931, 1933, 1935, 1936, 1938–39
- Yugoslav First League top scorer: 1929 (with 10 goals in 8 matches) and 1931 (with 12 goals in 10 matches)

Yugoslavia

- 1930 FIFA World Cup semi-finalist

== Trivia ==
He was nicknamed "Leteći fudbaler", translated to English "The flying footballer". This nickname was because during the last years he played with BSK he also worked as an employee in the National Bank of Yugoslavia, so as his work did not allow him to take numerous absences, when the club played away he did not travel earlier with the rest of the team, but he rather departed from Belgrade in last moments by airplane in order to come in time to the match.
