= Svetislav Valjarević =

Serbian footballer

Personal information
- Date of birth: 9 July 1911
- Place of birth: Belgrade, Kingdom of Serbia
- Date of death: 22 September 1996 (aged 85)
- Place of death: Vernon, France
- Position: Right midfielder

Youth career
- BSK Belgrade

Senior career*
Years	Team	Apps	(Gls)
1930–1937	Concordia Zagreb	48	(27)
1937–1941	BSK Belgrade	33	(22)

International career
1933–1941	Kingdom of Yugoslavia	12	(4)
- * Club domestic league appearances and goals

Svetislav Valjarević (Serbian Cyrillic: Светислав Ваљаревић; 9 July 1911 – 22 September 1996) was a Serbian footballer.

== Career ==
He started playing in the youth team of BSK Belgrade, however when he graduated the Military Academy, he was sent to service to Zagreb in 1930 where he joined HŠK Concordia. A year later after arriving, he won the national championship and was the league top-scorer. Specially noted for his great game vision and dangerous shot, he usually played in the position of right midfielder. When he went to the army conscription to Belgrade, he started playing for BSK Belgrade in the 1937-38 season winning, the 1938-39 Championship. He is remembered as one of the best players of the period when his club, BSK, was dominating the Yugoslav football in the late 1930s.

== International career ==
Beside one match played for the B team, the six matches for the City of Zagreb team and nine for the City of Belgrade team, he played 12 matches for Yugoslavia national football team having scored four times. His debut was on 30 April 1933 in Belgrade against Spain, and his last match was also in Belgrade, on 23 March 1941, against Hungary, that ended drow and he scored the only goal for Yugoslavia.

== Honours ==
Concordia Zagreb

- Yugoslav First League: 1931–32

Individual

- Yugoslav First League top-scorer: 1931–32 (10 goals)

BSK Belgrade

- Yugoslav First League: 1938–39
