= Erwin Puschner =

Austrian footballer (1896–1966)

Personal information
- Date of birth: 5 January 1896
- Date of death: 30 June 1966 (aged 70)
- Position: Defender

Senior career*
Years	Team	Apps	(Gls)
- Wiener AC

International career
1923–1924	Austria	2	(0)

Managerial career
- 1930: Hajduk Split
- * Club domestic league appearances and goals

Erwin Puschner (5 January 1896 – 30 June 1966) was an Austrian football player and manager. A defender, he played for Wiener AC and made two appearances for the Austria national team from 1923 to 1924. In 1930 he managed Hajduk Split.
