= Ljubiša Đorđević =

Serbian footballer

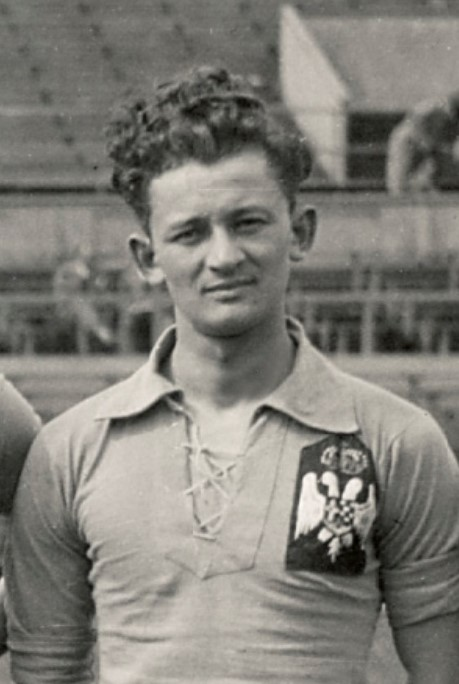
- Đorđević in 1928

Personal information
- Date of birth: 19 June 1906
- Place of birth: Belgrade, Kingdom of Serbia
- Date of death: 2 November 1944 (aged 38)
- Place of death: Belgrade, DF Yugoslavia

Senior career*
Years	Team	Apps	(Gls)
1926–1935	BSK	54	(0)

International career
1928–1931	Yugoslavia	5	(0)
- * Club domestic league appearances and goals

Ljubiša Đorđević (19 June 1906 – 2 November 1944) was a Serbian footballer. He competed in the men's tournament at the 1928 Summer Olympics. He was executed for supposed collaboration with Nazi Germany following the liberation of Belgrade in 1944.
