= Predrag Radovanović =

Serbian footballer and coach

Personal information
- Full name: Predrag Radovanović
- Date of birth: 27 March 1911
- Place of birth: Belgrade, Kingdom of Serbia
- Date of death: 1 August 1964 (aged 53)
- Place of death: Melbourne, Australia
- Height: 1.90 m (6 ft 3 in)
- Position: Defender

Senior career*
Years	Team	Apps	(Gls)
1928–1939	BSK	83	(2)

International career
1931	Yugoslavia	1	(0)
- * Club domestic league appearances and goals

Predrag Radovanović (Serbian Cyrillic: Предраг Радовановић; 27 March 1911 – 1 August 1964) was a Yugoslav footballer and coach.

== Biography ==
Nicknamed Pegi, he was born in Belgrade, Kingdom of Serbia. He began playing in the youth team of BSK in 1928. In 1930 he debuted for the first team and stayed in the club until 1937 winning 4 Yugoslav championships (1931, 1933, 1935 and 1936). Being quite tall (around 1.90m) he was a defender, full-back, known for his speed and maneuverability, with a simple and rational style of play and he formed a strong defensive duo with Dragomir Tošić contributing to BSK's successes.

He played one match for the Yugoslavia national team, played in Belgrade, on April 19, 1931, against Bulgaria for the Balkan Cup, a 1–0 victory.

After finishing his playing career he became a coach and worked in Ethiopia and Australia. He died in a car accident in Melbourne, Australia.
