= Milorad Arsenijević =

Serbian footballer

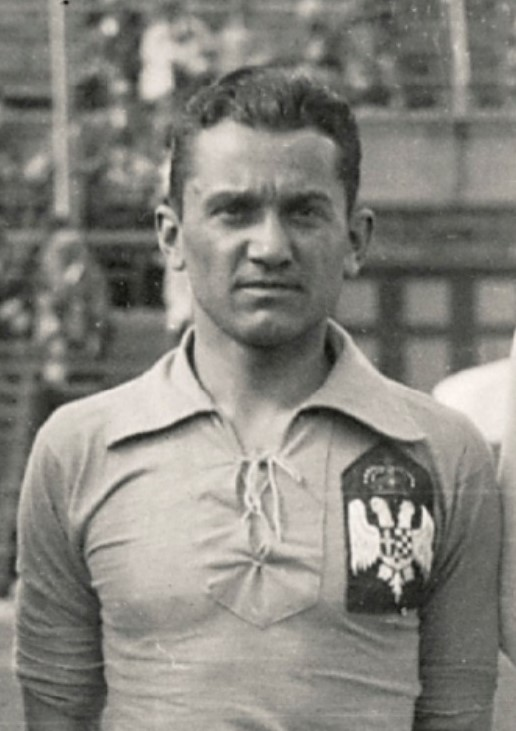
- Arsenijević in 1928

Personal information
- Date of birth: 6 June 1906
- Place of birth: Smederevo, Kingdom of Serbia
- Date of death: 18 March 1987 (aged 80)
- Place of death: Belgrade, SFR Yugoslavia
- Position: Midfielder

Youth career
- Mačva Šabac

Senior career*
Years	Team	Apps	(Gls)
1921–1925	Mačva Šabac		
1926–1938	BSK	97	(1)

International career
1927–1936	Kingdom of Yugoslavia	52	(0)

Managerial career
- 1946–1954: Yugoslavia
- Železničar Beograd
- * Club domestic league appearances and goals

Milorad Arsenijević (Serbian Cyrillic: Милорад Арсенијевић; 6 June 1906 – 18 March 1987) was a Serbian football player and manager. He was part of Yugoslavia's team at the 1928 Summer Olympics.

== Playing career ==
=== Club ===
He was born in Smederevo and grew up in Šabac. He started playing for the youth squad of the local team, FK Mačva Šabac, when he was 14 years old and later debuted for the main squad. After graduating highschool, he moved to Belgrade to continue his studies. He joined Beogradski sport klub (BSK), one of the dominant clubs of Yugoslav football at the time, where he would spend the rest of his career as one of their main defenders.

=== International ===
He earned 52 caps for the Yugoslavia national football team, including at the 1930 FIFA World Cup. His final international was a December 1936 friendly match away against France.

== Managerial career ==
After retiring as a player, he managed Yugoslavia in the 1950 FIFA World Cup and coached for a long period at lower-league club FK Železničar Beograd. He died in 1987 in Belgrade.
