= JŠK Slavija Osijek =

Croatian football club

SK Slavija Osijek was a Croatian football club formed in Osijek. The club was founded in 1916. It was the most influential club from the city in the period prior to World War II.

The club participated in the Yugoslav championship seven times: 1924, 1925, 1930, 1933, 1935, 1936, and 1937. In June 1938 a major fire occurred in which the stadium and most of the equipment were burned out.

Upon the establishment of the Independent State of Croatia in 1941 the club ceased to operate, and was not to be re-established in communist Yugoslavia which took power from 1945.

== Notable players ==
- Ernest Dubac
- Franjo Glaser
- Gustav Lechner
- Antun Lokošek
