= Yugoslav First League =

- Founded: 1923; 103 years ago
- Folded: 1992; 34 years ago
- Country: Yugoslavia
- Confederation: UEFA
- Level on pyramid: 1
- Relegation to: Yugoslav Second League
- Domestic cup: Yugoslav Cup
- International cup(s): European Cup; UEFA Cup
- Last champions: Red Star Belgrade (1991–92)
- Most championships: Red Star Belgrade (19 titles)
- Most appearances: Enver Marić (439)
- Top scorer: Slobodan Santrač (218)

The Yugoslav First League (Bosnian: Prva savezna liga u fudbalu, Serbian: Прва савезна лига у фудбалу, Prva savezna liga u fudbalu, Croatian: Prva savezna nogometna liga, Slovene: Prva zvezna nogometna liga, Macedonian: Прва сојузна фудбалска лига, romanized: Prva sojuzna fudbalska liga, Albanian: Liga e parë federale e futbollit, Hungarian: Első szövetségi labdarúgó-bajnokság) was the premier football league in the Kingdom of Yugoslavia (1923–1940) and Socialist Federal Republic of Yugoslavia (1946–1992).

The First League Championship was one of two national competitions held annually in Yugoslavia, the Yugoslav Cup being the other.

The league became fully professional in 1967.

== Kingdom of Yugoslavia (1923–1940) ==
This was the first club competition on a national level for clubs from Kingdom of Yugoslavia (named the Kingdom of Serbs, Croats and Slovenes until 1929). The league was started in 1923 and the first four seasons had a cup tournament format, while the first round-robin league competition was held in 1927. In the period from 1927 to 1940 seventeen seasons were completed, with all the titles won by clubs from Croatia (Građanski Zagreb, Concordia Zagreb, HAŠK Zagreb and Hajduk Split) or Serbia (BSK and SK Jugoslavija).

It was governed at first by the Croatian-named Nogometni Savez Jugoslavije (Football Association of Yugoslavia), founded in April 1919 in Zagreb, until in late 1929 disagreements arose between the Zagreb and Belgrade branches of the association. This resulted in the association headquarters being moved to Belgrade in May 1930 where it adopted the Serbian name Fudbalski Savez Jugoslavije and continued operating the league until it was suspended due to the outbreak of World War II. Consequently, with the moving of headquarters, Croatian players and coaches boycotted Yugoslavia national team. With the Axis invasion of Yugoslavia, separate Croatian and Serbian leagues were established, which operated during the World War II.

=== Champions and top scorers ===
Season	Format	Champions	Runners-up	Top scorer(s)	Goals
1923	Cup tournament (One-legged knockout; 6 clubs)	Građanski Zagreb (1)	SAŠK Sarajevo	Dragan Jovanović (SK Jugoslavija)	4
1924	Cup tournament (One-legged knockout; 7 clubs)	SK Jugoslavija (1)	Hajduk Split	Dragan Jovanović (SK Jugoslavija)	6
1925	Cup tournament (One-legged knockout; 7 clubs)	SK Jugoslavija (2)	Građanski Zagreb	Dragan Jovanović (SK Jugoslavija)	4
1926	Cup tournament (One-legged knockout; 7 clubs)	Građanski Zagreb (2)	SK Jugoslavija	Dušan Petković (SK Jugoslavija)	4
1927	League (Single round-robin; 6 clubs)	Hajduk Split (1)	BSK	Kuzman Sotirović (BSK)	6
1928	League (Single round-robin; 6 clubs)	Građanski Zagreb (3)	Hajduk Split	Ljubo Benčić (Hajduk Split)	8
1929	League (Double round-robin; 5 clubs)	Hajduk Split (2)	BSK	Đorđe Vujadinović (BSK)	10
1930	League (Double round-robin; 6 clubs)	Concordia Zagreb (1)	SK Jugoslavija	Blagoje Marjanović (BSK)	10
1931	League (Double round-robin; 6 clubs)	BSK (1)	Concordia Zagreb	Đorđe Vujadinović (BSK)	12
1932	Cup tournament (Two-legged knockout; 8 clubs)	Concordia Zagreb (2)	Hajduk Split	Svetislav Valjarević (Concordia Zagreb)	10
1933	League (Double round-robin; 11 clubs)	BSK (2)	Hajduk Split	Vladimir Kragić (Hajduk Split)	21
1934	National championship was not played.				
1935	League (Double round-robin; 10 clubs)	BSK (3)	SK Jugoslavija	Leo Lemešić (Hajduk Split)	18
1936	Cup tournament (Two-legged knockout; 14 clubs)	BSK (4)	Slavija Sarajevo	Blagoje Marjanović (BSK)	5
1936–37	League (Double round-robin; 10 clubs)	Građanski Zagreb (4)	Hajduk Split	Blagoje Marjanović (BSK)	21
1937–38	League (Double round-robin; 10 clubs)	HAŠK Zagreb (1)	BSK	August Lešnik (Građanski Zagreb)	17
1938–39	League (Double round-robin; 12 clubs)	BSK (5)	Građanski Zagreb	August Lešnik (Građanski Zagreb)	22
1939–40	League (Double round-robin; 6 clubs)	Građanski Zagreb (5)	BSK	Svetislav Glišović (BSK)	10

=== Performance by clubs ===
#	Club	Champions	Runners-up
1	BSK	5	4
2	Građanski Zagreb	5	2
3	Hajduk Split	2	5
4	SK Jugoslavija	2	3
5	Concordia Zagreb	2	1
6	HAŠK	1	0
7	Slavija Sarajevo	0	1
8	SAŠK Sarajevo	0	1

== World War II competitions ==
- Serbian Football League (1940–1944), in Serbia (Territory of the Military Commander in Serbia)
- Croatian First League (1941–1944), in Croatia (Independent State of Croatia)

== Post-World War II tournament ==
Season	Champions	Runners-up	Third place	Top scorer(s)	Goals
1945 (Note: A special format tournament was held to re-affirm the newly found Yugoslav unity. The tournament consisted of eight teams: six representing Bosnia and Herzegovina, Croatia, Macedonia, Montenegro, Serbia and Slovenia respectively, one representing Vojvodina, an autonomous region within Serbia and finally the Jugoslovenska Narodna Armija team, a selection of Yugoslav People's Army football players.)	SR Serbia (1)	JNA	SR Croatia	Stjepan Bobek (JNA)	8

== SFR Yugoslavia (1946–1992) ==
=== Champions and top scorers ===
Season	Champions	Runners-up	Third place	Top scorer(s)	Goals
1946–47	Partizan (1)	Dinamo Zagreb	Red Star	Franjo Wölfl (Dinamo Zagreb)	28
1947–48	Dinamo Zagreb (1)	Hajduk Split	Partizan	Franjo Wölfl (Dinamo Zagreb)	22
1948–49	Partizan (2)	Red Star	Hajduk Split	Frane Matošić (Hajduk Split)	17
1950	Hajduk Split (1)	Red Star	Partizan	Marko Valok (Partizan)	17
1951	Red Star (1)	Dinamo Zagreb	Hajduk Split	Kosta Tomašević (Red Star)	16
1952	Hajduk Split (2)	Red Star	Lokomotiva	Stanoje Jocić (BSK)	13
1952–53	Red Star (2)	Hajduk Split	Partizan	Todor Živanović (Red Star)	17
1953–54	Dinamo Zagreb (2)	Partizan	Red Star	Stjepan Bobek (Partizan)	21
1954–55	Hajduk Split (3)	BSK	Dinamo Zagreb	Predrag Marković (BSK); Kosta Tomašević (Spartak Subotica); Bernard Vukas (Hajduk Split)	20
1955–56	Red Star (3)	Partizan	Radnički Belgrade	Muhamed Mujić (Velež Mostar); Tihomir Ognjanov (Spartak Subotica); Todor Veselinović (Vojvodina)	21
1956–57	Red Star (4)	Vojvodina	Hajduk Split	Todor Veselinović (Vojvodina)	28
1957–58	Dinamo Zagreb (3)	Partizan	Radnički Belgrade	Todor Veselinović (Vojvodina)	19
1958–59	Red Star (5)	Partizan	Vojvodina	Bora Kostić (Red Star)	25
1959–60	Red Star (6)	Dinamo Zagreb	Partizan	Bora Kostić (Red Star)	19
1960–61	Partizan (3)	Red Star	Hajduk Split	Zoran Prljinčević (Radnički Belgrade); Todor Veselinović (Vojvodina)	16
1961–62	Partizan (4)	Vojvodina	Dinamo Zagreb	Dražan Jerković (Dinamo Zagreb)	16
1962–63	Partizan (5)	Dinamo Zagreb	Željezničar	Mišo Smajlović (Željezničar)	18
1963–64	Red Star (7)	OFK Belgrade	Dinamo Zagreb	Asim Ferhatović (FK Sarajevo)	19
1964–65	Partizan (6)	FK Sarajevo	Red Star	Zlatko Dračić (NK Zagreb)	23
1965–66	Vojvodina (1)	Dinamo Zagreb	Velež Mostar	Petar Nadoveza (Hajduk Split)	21
1966–67	FK Sarajevo (1)	Dinamo Zagreb	Partizan	Mustafa Hasanagić (Partizan)	18
1967–68	Red Star (8)	Partizan	Dinamo Zagreb	Slobodan Santrač (OFK Belgrade)	22
1968–69	Red Star (9)	Dinamo Zagreb	Partizan	Vojin Lazarević (Red Star)	22
1969–70	Red Star (10)	Partizan	Velež Mostar	Slobodan Santrač (OFK Belgrade); Dušan Bajević (Velež Mostar)	20
1970–71	Hajduk Split (4)	Željezničar	Dinamo Zagreb	Petar Nadoveza (Hajduk Split); Božo Janković (Željezničar)	20
1971–72	Željezničar (1)	Red Star	OFK Belgrade	Slobodan Santrač (OFK Belgrade)	33
1972–73	Red Star (11)	Velež Mostar	OFK Belgrade	Slobodan Santrač (OFK Belgrade); Vojin Lazarević (Red Star)	25
1973–74	Hajduk Split (5)	Velež Mostar	Red Star	Danilo Popivoda (Olimpija Ljubljana)	17
1974–75	Hajduk Split (6)	Vojvodina	Red Star	Dušan Savić (Red Star); Boško Đorđević (Partizan)	20
1975–76	Partizan (7)	Hajduk Split	Dinamo Zagreb	Nenad Bjeković (Partizan)	24
1976–77	Red Star (12)	Dinamo Zagreb	Sloboda Tuzla	Zoran Filipović (Red Star)	21
1977–78	Partizan (8)	Red Star	Hajduk Split	Radomir Savić (Sarajevo)	21
1978–79	Hajduk Split (7)	Dinamo Zagreb	Red Star	Dušan Savić (Red Star)	24
1979–80	Red Star (13)	FK Sarajevo	Radnički Niš	Safet Sušić (Sarajevo); Dragoljub Kostić (Napredak Kruševac)	17
1980–81	Red Star (14)	Hajduk Split	Radnički Niš	Milan Radović (Rijeka)	26
1981–82	Dinamo Zagreb (4)	Red Star	Hajduk Split	Snješko Cerin (Dinamo Zagreb)	19
1982–83	Partizan (9)	Hajduk Split	Dinamo Zagreb	Sulejman Halilović (Dinamo Vinkovci)	18
1983–84	Red Star (15)	Partizan	Željezničar	Darko Pančev (Vardar)	19
1984–85	FK Sarajevo (2)	Hajduk Split	Partizan	Zlatko Vujović (Hajduk Split)	25
1985–86	Partizan (10)	Red Star	Velež Mostar	Davor Čop (Dinamo Vinkovci)	20
1986–87	Partizan (11)	Velež Mostar	Red Star	Radmilo Mihajlović (Željezničar)	23
1987–88	Red Star (16)	Partizan	Velež Mostar	Duško Milinković (Rad)	16
1988–89	Vojvodina (2)	Red Star	Hajduk Split	Davor Šuker (Osijek)	18
1989–90	Red Star (17)	Dinamo Zagreb	Hajduk Split	Darko Pančev (Red Star)	25
1990–91	Red Star (18)	Dinamo Zagreb	Partizan	Darko Pančev (Red Star)	34
1991–92 (Note: The last championship started without clubs from newly independent Slovenia and Croatia, while clubs from Bosnia, with exception of FK Borac Banja Luka, too abandoned competition on a winter break with imminent country's independence, leaving only Serbian, Montenegrin and Macedonian clubs competing in the second half of the season. (See subsection on 1991–92.))	Red Star (19)	Partizan	Vojvodina	Darko Pančev (Red Star)	25

=== Titles by club ===
Club	Titles	Winning seasons
Red Star	19	1951, 1952–53, 1955–56, 1956–57, 1958–59, 1959–60, 1963–64, 1967–68, 1968–69, 1969–70, 1972–73, 1976–77, 1979–80, 1980–81, 1983–84, 1987–88, 1989–90, 1990–91, 1991–92
Partizan	11	1946–47, 1948–49, 1960–61, 1961–62, 1962–63, 1964–65, 1975–76, 1977–78, 1982–83, 1985–86, 1986–87
Hajduk Split	7	1950, 1952, 1954–55, 1970–71, 1973–74, 1974–75, 1978–79
Dinamo Zagreb	4	1947–48, 1953–54, 1957–58, 1981–82
Vojvodina	2	1965–66, 1988–89
Sarajevo	2	1966–67, 1984–85
Željezničar	1	1971–72

=== Titles by republic ===
Republic	Titles	Clubs
SR Serbia	32	Red Star, Partizan, Vojvodina
SR Croatia	11	Hajduk Split, Dinamo Zagreb
SR Bosnia and Herzegovina	3	Sarajevo, Željezničar
SR Macedonia	0	–
SR Montenegro	0	–
SR Slovenia	0	–

=== Performance by club ===
Club	Champions	Runners-up	Third place	Total top three finishes
Red Star Belgrade	19	9	7	35
Partizan	11	9	8	28
Hajduk Split	7	6	8	21
Dinamo Zagreb	4	11	7	22
Vojvodina	2	3	2	7
Sarajevo	2	2	0	4
Željezničar	1	1	2	4
Velež Mostar	0	3	4	7
OFK Belgrade*	0	2	2	4
Radnički Belgrade	0	0	2	2
Radnički Niš	0	0	2	2
Lokomotiva Zagreb	0	0	1	1
Sloboda Tuzla	0	0	1	1

*Known as BSK before 1957

=== All-Time First Yugoslav League table ===
Top 12 only:

Rank	Club	MP	W	D	L	GF	GA	GD	P
1	Red Star	1335	719	328	288	2560	1415	+1145	1766
2	Partizan	1335	657	354	324	2285	1428	+857	1668
3	Dinamo Zagreb	1302	597	366	339	2151	1495	+656	1560
4	Hajduk Split	1302	587	346	369	2088	1486	+602	1520
5	Vojvodina	1221	465	311	445	1670	1595	+75	1241
6	Sarajevo	1228	447	311	470	1674	1773	-99	1205
7	Velež Mostar	1174	435	309	430	1668	1615	+53	1179
8	Željezničar	1063	403	274	386	1456	1424	+32	1080
9	OFK Beograd	977	343	281	353	1355	1355	0	967
10	Radnički Niš	979	339	250	390	1088	1244	-156	928
11	Vardar	1005	328	251	426	1195	1459	-264	907
12	Rijeka	898	310	252	336	1083	1163	-80	857

=== Best finish in Europe by club ===
Table only shows best-finish achievements in major European/Intercontinental competitions during the SFR Yugoslavia period (1945–1992).
No minor European tournaments (like Mitropa Cup) included.
Table sorted by success at European Cup / UEFA Champions League first and foremost.

Club	European Cup / UEFA Champions League	UEFA Cup / Europa League	UEFA Cup Winners' Cup	UEFA Super Cup	Intercontinental Cup	Inter-Cities Fairs Cup	UEFA Intertoto Cup
Red Star Belgrade	Winner; 1990–91	Runners-up; 1978–79	Semi-finals; 1974–75	Runners-up; 1991	Winner; 1991	Semi-finals; 1961–62	–
Partizan	Runners-up; 1965–66	Third Round (3); 1974–75; 1984–85; 1990–91	Quarter-finals; 1989–90	–	–	Second Round; 1967–68	–
Hajduk Split	Quarter-finals (3); 1975–76; 1979–80; 1994-1995	Semi-finals; 1983–84	Semi-finals; 1972–73	–	–	Second Round; 1970–71	–
Vojvodina	Quarter-finals; 1966–67	–	–	–	–	Quarter-finals; 1961–62 as Novi Sad XI	Group Winner; 1976
Sarajevo	Second Round; 1967–68	Third Round; 1982–83	–	–	–	–	Group Stage (2); 1962–63; 1964–65
Željezničar	First Round; 1972–73	Semi-finals; 1984–85	–	–	–	First Round; 1970–71	Group Stage; 1965–66
Dinamo Zagreb	First Round; 1982–83	Second Round (3); 1971–72; 1976–77; 1988–89	Semi-finals; 1960–61	–	–	Winner; 1966–67	–
Vardar	First Round; 1987–88	Second Round; 1985–86	First Round; 1961–62	–	–	–	–
Radnički Niš	–	Semi-finals; 1981–82	–	–	–	–	Group Stage (2); 1964–65; 1965–66
OFK Beograd	–	Quarter-finals; 1972–73	Semi-finals; 1962–63	–	–	Semi-finals; 1958–60 as Belgrade XI	–
Velež Mostar	–	Quarter-finals; 1974–75	Second Round (2); 1981–82; 1986–87	–	–	–	Group Stage (2); 1962–63; 1963–64
Rijeka	–	Second Round; 1984–85	Quarter-finals; 1979–80	–	–	–	Quarter-finals; 1962–63
Sloboda Tuzla	–	First Round; 1977–78	–	–	–	–	Group Winner; 1983
Rad	–	First Round; 1989–90	–	–	–	–	Group Runners-up; 1988
Borac Banja Luka	–	–	Second Round; 1975–76	–	–	–	–
Olimpija Ljubljana	–	-	First Round; 1970–71	–	–	First Round (2); 1966–67; 1968–69	Group Runners-up; 1990
Bor	–	–	First Round; 1968–69	–	–	–	–
Budućnost	–	–	–	–	–	–	Group Winner; 1981
Čelik Zenica	–	–	–	–	–	–	Group Winner; 1975

While the Inter-Cities Fairs Cup is recognised as the predecessor to the UEFA Cup, it was not organised by UEFA. Consequently, UEFA do not consider clubs' records in the Fairs Cup to be part of their European record. However, FIFA do view the competition as a major honour.

=== All time top goalscorers ===
Complete list of players who scored 100 goals or more in the 1946-1992 SFR Yugoslavia period.
Source: RSSSF; Last updated 14 December 2007

#	Name	Goals	Matches	Goal ratio	Clubs	Years
1	Slobodan Santrač	218	365	0.60	OFK Beograd, Partizan, Zemun	1965–1974, 1976–1980, 1982–1983
2	Darko Pančev	168	243	0.69	Vardar, Red Star	1982–1992
3	Dušan Bajević	166	322	0.51	Velež	1966–1977, 1981–1983
4	Bora Kostić	158	257	0.61	Red Star	1951–1961, 1962–1966
5	Frane Matošić	149			Hajduk Split	1946–1953
6	Toza Veselinović	145	227	0.64	Vojvodina, Partizan, Proleter Zrenjanin	1948–1949, 1951–1961, 1968
7	Stjepan Bobek	129	201	0.64	Partizan	1945–1956
=7	Zoran Prljinčević	129			Radnički Beograd, Red Star	
9	Dušan Savić	120	202	0.59	Red Star	1973–1982
10	Dragan Džajić	113	306	0.37	Red Star	1963–1975, 1977–1978
11	Vojin Lazarević	112	188	0.60	Sutjeska, Red Star	1964–1965, 1966–1970, 1972–1974
=11	Momčilo Vukotić	112	395	0.28	Partizan	1968–1978, 1979–1985
13	Josip Bukal	111	258	0.43	Željezničar	1963–1973, 1977–1978
14	Petar Nadoveza	108	217	0.50	Hajduk Split	1963–1973
15	Kosta Tomašević	104	156	0.67	Red Star, Spartak Subotica	1946–1956
16	Vahid Halilhodžić	103	207	0.50	Velež	1972–1981
17	Snješko Cerin	103			Dinamo	1976–1986
18	Petar Nikezić	102	301	0.34	Vojvodina, Osijek	1967–1978, 1979–1982
19	Zlatko Vujović	101	240	0.42	Hajduk Split	1977–1986

=== All-time top appearances ===
#	Name	Appearances	Clubs	Years
1	Enver Marić	429	Velež	1967–1976, 1978–1985
2	Slavko Vlahović	413	Budućnost	1977–1991
3	Slobodan Janjuš	403	Željezničar, Vojvodina, Sarajevo, Olimpija, Dinamo, Sutjeska	1970–1977, 1985–1988, 1977–1978, 1981–1982, 1982–1983, 1983–1984, 1984–1985
4	Nedžad Verlašević	397	Sloboda Tuzla, Željezničar	1975–1983, 1983–1985, 1987–1990, 1985–1986
5	Momčilo Vukotić	395	Partizan	1968–1978, 1979–1984
6	Vili Ameršek	392	Olimpija	1966–1976, 1979–1984
7	Slobodan Santrač	365	OFK Beograd, Partizan, Zemun	1965–1974, 1976–1977, 1977–1980, 1982–1983
8	Franjo Vladić	361	Velež	1968–1979, 1981–1985
9	Tone Rožič	360	Olimpija	1970–1984
10	Ilija Petković	354	OFK Beograd	1964–1973, 1976–1983
11	Kočo Dimitrovski	336	Vardar	1968–1985
12	Mustafa Hukić	332	Sloboda Tuzla	1968–1978, 1983–1985
13	Ivica Miljković	327	Dinamo, Osijek	1969–1977, 1977–1980
14	Dušan Bajević	322	Velež	1966–1977, 1981–1983
15	Ibrahim Biogradlić	318	Sarajevo	1951–1967
16	Milovan Obradović	312	Radnički Niš, Vojvodina	1974–1985, 1985–1986
17	Ivica Hlevnjak	312	Hajduk Split	1962–1973
18	Dragan Holcer	310	Radnički Niš, Hajduk Split	1963–1967, 1967–1975
19	Ratomir Dujković	308	Red Star, Osijek, Zemun	1962–1974, 1977–1980, 1980–1983
20	Dragan Džajić	306	Red Star	1963–1975, 1977–1978

=== Notable clubs (at least 10 top-flight seasons or at least one title) ===
Over the years the Yugoslav First League featured many different teams, but there were always a number of teams that stood out, typically from the bigger cities. Among these were:

SR Bosnia and Herzegovina

- FK Sarajevo, Sarajevo (43 seasons, 2 titles)
- Velež, Mostar (38 seasons)
- Željezničar, Sarajevo (34 seasons, 1 title)
- Sloboda, Tuzla (25 seasons)
- Čelik, Zenica (17 seasons)
- Borac, Banja Luka (14 seasons)
- Slavija, Sarajevo (11 seasons)

SR Croatia

- Hajduk, Split (62 seasons, 9 titles)
- Dinamo, Zagreb (59 seasons, 9 titles)
- NK Rijeka, Rijeka (29 seasons)
- NK Zagreb, Zagreb (18 seasons)
- NK Osijek, Osijek (13 seasons)
- Concordia, Zagreb (9 seasons, 2 titles)
- HAŠK, Zagreb (8 seasons, 1 title)

SR Macedonia

- Vardar, Skopje (33 seasons)

SR Montenegro

- Budućnost, Podgorica (26 seasons)

SR Serbia

- OFK Beograd, Belgrade (50 seasons)
- Red Star Belgrade, Belgrade (46 seasons, 19 titles)
- Partizan, Belgrade (46 seasons, 11 titles)
- Vojvodina, Novi Sad (44 seasons, 2 titles)
- Radnički, Niš (29 seasons)
- Jugoslavija, Belgrade (14 seasons, 2 titles)
- Spartak, Subotica (16 seasons)

SR Slovenia

- Olimpija, Ljubljana (22 seasons)

=== UEFA coefficients ===
The following data indicates historical Yugoslav coefficient rankings among European football leagues.

View source data.

== Successor leagues ==
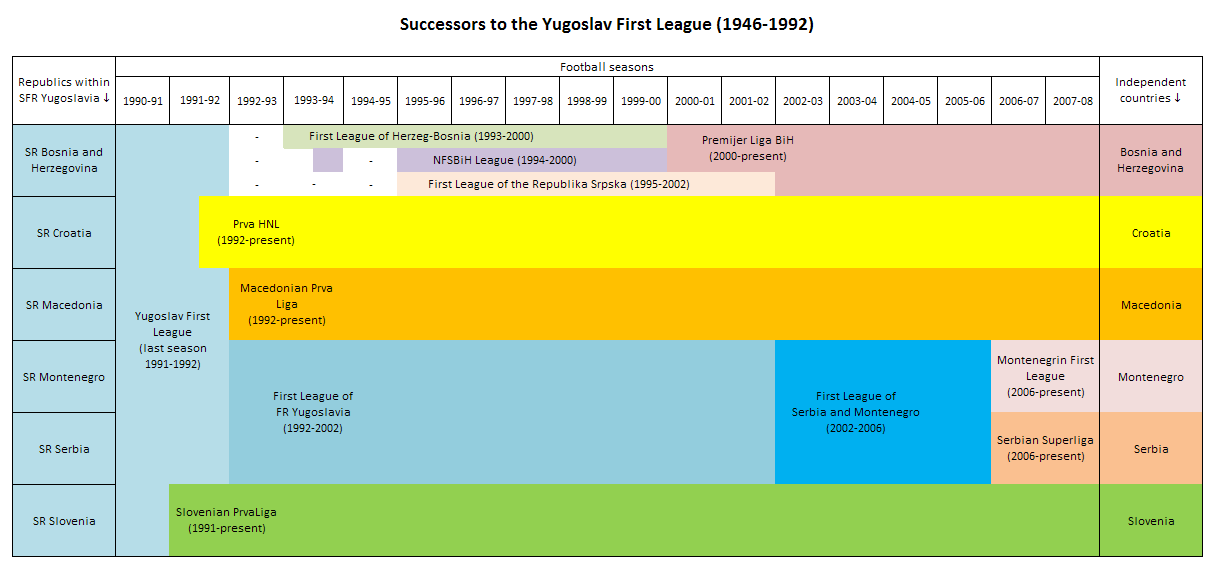
Timeline chart showing Yugoslav First League successors

The 1990–91 season was the last season held in its usual format, with clubs from all federative units participating in the championship. The breakup of the country also broke up its top-flight league into several smaller ones.

The UEFA recognised the First League of FR Yugoslavia as its successor league.

=== Slovenia and Croatia depart ===
In June 1991 Slovenia declared independence and Croatia followed suit in October of the same year. This meant that their football associations separated from the Football Association of Yugoslavia so they both started their own football leagues. The Slovenian PrvaLiga was launched in late 1991, while the Croatian Prva HNL saw its first edition in 1992. Affected by the ongoing war in Croatia, the season was held over the course of a single calendar year, from February to June 1992. Both leagues have been going on ever since.

=== 1991–92 season ===
The 1991–92 season was the last season held officially under the name of SFR Yugoslavia, even though Slovenian and Croatian clubs have already abandoned the competition to play in their own leagues. Clubs from the remaining four federative units all took part in the competition, but since the Bosnian War broke out towards the end of the season, Bosnian clubs never finished it, with Željezničar of Sarajevo only managed to play 17 out of 33 scheduled fixtures, while Sloboda Tuzla and Velež Mostar ended the season with a few games short of completing the season. Still, since most of the games were played as planned, Crvena Zvezda of Belgrade is credited with winning the last Yugoslav First League championship.

=== North Macedonia and FR Yugoslavia ===
Macedonian clubs abandoned the competition after the 1991–92 season because the new Macedonian First League was launched the following season. For the 1992–93 season Bosnian clubs were all on hiatus due to full blown fighting that developed there, with the sole exception of Borac of Banja Luka (the strongest Bosnian Serb side at the time) which temporarily moved to Belgrade and joined the newly formed league featuring clubs from Serbia and Montenegro, this time restyled as the First League of FR Yugoslavia. (Serbia and Montenegro, the only ones left after other four member republics declared independence, renamed their country Federal Republic of Yugoslavia.) The league lasted under that name until the 2002–03 season, when the country changed its name so the league was renamed First League of Serbia and Montenegro. Finally, in June 2006 Montenegro declared independence and peacefully departed the union, so from the 2006–07 season onwards Montenegro started operating separate top-flight football league supervised by its football association. On the other hand, as the legal successor of Serbia-Montenegro state union, Serbia also got the continuity of the country's league that was formed as Prva liga (First League) in 1992, and renamed and rebranded as Superliga in summer 2005.

=== Bosnia and Herzegovina ===
Bosnia and Herzegovina proclaimed independence in late winter 1992, and already in April same year N/FSBiH applied for membership with FIFA and UEFA. Meanwhile, due to the outbreak of Bosnian War in April 1992 no games were played in the 1992–93 season. In late 1993 some parts of the country re-launched football competitions with reduced scope. But just as the country was divided along ethnic lines, so was football.

In 1993 Bosnian Croats launched the First League of Herzeg-Bosnia in which only Croatian clubs competed on parochial scale within the limits of West Herzegovina and few other enclaves. In the same year Bosnian Serbs also organized their own First League of the Republika Srpska, on a territory held by Republika Srpska regime at the time. Only football on a territory under the control of then Republic of Bosnia and Herzegovina institutions and auspices of N/FSBiH, at the time consequently with Bosniak majority, apart from a brief competition for the season 1994–95 (won by Čelik Zenica), came to a standstill. Competition under auspices of N/FSBiH did not resume until 1995–96 season when the First League of Bosnia and Herzegovina was launched.

These three separate football leagues were operating in Bosnia and Herzegovina until 1998, and 2000. Since FIFA and UEFA showed support only for the association operating under patronage of the official and internationally recognized state institutions, during the war and prior to Dayton Peace Agreement as well as after its signage, they endorsed unification of all three organizations as N/FSBiH. This also came as a consequence of FIFA decision to recognize N/FSBiH already in July 1996, while in the same year UEFA admitted N/FSBiH as an adjacent member until 1998 when they recognized its full membership. This meant that only N/FSBiH clubs and its national team could compete at the international and official level.

Final unification has been preceded by several stages. At first was created a playoff where clubs were playing for the champion under N/FSBiH auspices. Idea was that playoff under unified N/FSBiH auspices should bring together clubs competing under three separate organizations for the first time but was rejected by Serb association, leaving clubs from Croat football association and N/FSBiH participating playoff for the seasons 1997–98 and 1999–00, while 1998–99 playoff was canceled due to Croat's association hesitation on the decision on which stadiums games should be played. Next season playoff was resumed for the last time prior to full and final agreement on unified N/FSBiH and its competition, Premier League BiH (Premijer Liga), in the fall 2000. However, the first 2000–01 season seen clubs from Federation of BiH only, while clubs from Republic of Srpska entity continue to compete in their own separate league as their entity association still refused to join agreed unified N/FSBiH and its new competition. However, UEFA and FIFA never intended to recognize this separate organization nor its competition, which meant clubs couldn't compete outside territory of the entity and wouldn't see any international football. This situation forced clubs to insist that their organization also join N/FSBiH, and two years later they became part of the competition for the season 2002–03. Ever since the year 2000 Premier League is the top tier of Bosnia and Herzegovina football, with two entity-based leagues, First League of Republika Srpska and First League of the Federation of BiH, being pushed to the second tier of the football pyramid and serve as feeder leagues to Premier League.

=== Today's top flight successors ===
- Bosnia and Herzegovina → Premier League of Bosnia and Herzegovina (2000–present; from 1994 to 2000 had a First League of Bosnia and Herzegovina)
- Croatia → HNL (1992–present)
- Kosovo → Football Superleague of Kosovo (2016–present) (Note: From 1991 until 1999 unrecognized competition in Kosovo parallel to Serbian league system was organized, while one which was recognized compete in the 5th level of the Yugoslav league system. The champion would gain promotion to Serbian Republic League, one of Yugoslav 4th tiers. Since 1999-2000 season the Superleague ran outside FIFA and UEFA until Kosovo was admitted to both organizations, on 3 May 2016.)
- North Macedonia → Macedonian First League (1992–present)
- Montenegro → Montenegrin First League (2006–present; from 1992 to 2006 had a joint league with Serbia)
- Serbia → Serbian SuperLiga (2006–present, from 1992 to 2006 had a joint league with Montenegro)
- Slovenia → Slovenian PrvaLiga (1991–present)

UEFA recognised FR Yugoslavia and subsequently Serbia as the only official successor of Yugoslavia and consequently the clubs from FR Yugoslavia kept the ranking and ponctuation within UEFA.

== See also ==
- Yugoslav Cup
- Serbian Football League (1940–44)
- Football Association of Yugoslavia
- Yugoslavia national football team
