= See You in Montevideo =

2014 film

- Theatrical release poster
- Directed by: Dragan Bjelogrlić
- Written by: Dragan Bjelogrlić
- Produced by: Dejan Petrović
- Starring: Miloš Biković; Petar Strugar; Predrag Vasić
- Cinematography: Goran Volarević
- Edited by: Petar Marković; Dejan Urošević; Svetolik Zajc
- Music by: Roberto Magnifico
- Distributed by: Intermedia Network
- Release date: 14 January 2014
- Running time: 142 minutes
- Country: Serbia
- Languages: Serbian; English; French; Spanish

See You in Montevideo (Serbian: Монтевидео, видимо се!/Montevideo, vidimo se!) is a 2014 Serbian sports comedy film written and directed by Dragan Bjelogrlić. It is the sequel to the 2010 film Montevideo, God Bless You! It was selected as the Serbian entry for the Best Foreign Language Film at the 87th Academy Awards, but was not nominated. See You in Montevideo was shot over a number of locations, Paraćin, Belgrade, Ulcinj, Trieste, and also the Spanish Island of Tenerife.

== Plot ==
The Yugoslavia national team prepares to participate in the inaugural FIFA World Cup, the world championship for men's national association football teams that will take place in the capital of Uruguay, Montevideo in 1930. After a lengthy trip over the Atlantic Ocean, the Yugoslavia national team finds themselves amongst 12 other nations, competing for the World Cup.

The Yugoslavia team are the underdogs of the tournament and are given a minimal chance of succeeding after being drawn with the favorites of the tournament, Brazil. Thanks to the talent and dedication of the players, they defeat Bolivia and Brazil in their group stage and advance to the knockout stage.

However, before and especially after the match against Bolivia, the team loses the spirit of unity between them. Some players become interested in contracts offered by Mr. Hotchkins, an American football businessman, and some of them start doubting if they will come back to Yugoslavia after the tournament. Tirke falls in love with a local lady named Dolores.

The Yugoslav team is drawn to play against Uruguay. On the pre-match training, the team looks very unmotivated and players fight with each other. At the same time, Tirke is being held at the house of Dolores by her brother, as he doesn't want him to play against his nation. His teammates eventually free him, and get their team spirit risen up again.

The atmosphere at Centenario before the game feels like a war, where everyone is against the Yugoslavs. In the match itself, Yugoslavia scores first, but then concedes, and has their goal disputedly disallowed, while the Uruguay's goal gets scored after an assist from a policeman standing besides the pitch, as the referee prefers to keep it safe as the stadium is furious. Yugoslavia loses the game.

After they return to the hotel, they meet the United States team and decide to organise a match for third place between them, which the Yugoslavs eventually win and receive the bronze medal. (Note: There is disagreement on which team came third place in the real tournament, as discussed in here.) All the players decline Hotchkins' offers.

== Cast ==
- Miloš Biković as Aleksandar "Tirke" Tirnanić
- Petar Strugar as Blagoje "Moša" Marjanović
- Viktor Savić as Milutin "Milutinac" Ivković
- Armand Assante as Hotchkins
- Elena Martínez as Dolores
- Branko Đurić as Paco
- Srđan Todorović as Bora Jovanović
- Predrag Vasić as Little Stanoje
- Nebojša Ilić as Boško "Dunster" Simonović
- Vojin Ćetković as Mihajlo Andrejević
- Srđan Timarov as Kosta Hadži
- Aleksandar Radojčić as Milorad "Balerina" Arsenijević
- Uroš Jovicić as Đorđe "Ðokica Nosonja" Vujadinović
- Bojan Krivokapić as Momčilo "Gusar" Đokić
- Andrija Kuzmanović as Milovan "Jakša" Jakšić
- Ivan Zekić as Ivan "Ivica" Bek
- Nenad Heraković as Dragoslav "Vampir" Mihajlović
- Aleksandar Filimonović as Ljubiša "Leo" Stevanović
- Rade Ćosić as Teofilo Spasojević
- Milan Nikitović as Branislav "Bane" Sekulić
- Bojan Micic as Bertrand "Bert" Patenaude
- Peter J. Chaffey as Thomas "Tom" Florie

== See also ==
- List of submissions to the 87th Academy Awards for Best Foreign Language Film
- List of Serbian submissions for the Academy Award for Best Foreign Language Film
