= Montevideo, God Bless You! =

- Official Poster
- Directed by: Dragan Bjelogrlić
- Written by: Srđan Dragojević; Ranko Božić
- Based on: Montevideo, Bog te video by Vladimir Stanković
- Produced by: Dejan Petrović
- Starring: Miloš Biković; Petar Strugar; Nina Janković; Danina Jeftić
- Cinematography: Goran Volarević
- Edited by: Marko Glušac
- Music by: Magnifico
- Release date: December 21, 2010
- Running time: 140 minutes
- Country: Serbia
- Language: Serbian
- Box office: $2,192,931 (Serbia)

Montevideo, God Bless You! (Serbian: Монтевидео, Бог те видео!, romanized: Montevideo, Bog te video!; internationally titled Montevideo, Taste of a Dream) is a 2010 Serbian sports comedy film directed by Dragan Bjelogrlić about the events leading to the participation of the Yugoslavia national football team at the first FIFA World Cup in Montevideo, Uruguay in July 1930. The film gained considerable media attention throughout 2010 and achieved significant box office success in Serbia since its release on December 21, 2010. The entire project has been hugely successful regionally thus far. More than 520,000 people in Serbia saw the first film, which won numerous awards.

The story is loosely based on the novel Montevideo, Bog te video by the prominent Serbian sports journalist Vladimir Stanković. He drew inspiration to write a romanticized depiction of the late 1920s Serbia and the events that popularized the game of football in the country after having watched the American film The Game of Their Lives.

The film was awarded the 'Audience Choice Award' for Best Film in the main competition program at the 33rd Moscow International Film Festival. It was also Serbia's official submission for Best Foreign Language Film at the 84th Academy Awards, but did not make the final shortlist.

A sequel, See You in Montevideo, was released on January 14, 2014.

Part of the movie was filmed in the city of La Laguna, Tenerife, and part of the movie was filmed in the city of Trieste.

== Plot ==
In 1930 Belgrade, Yugoslavia, eleven passionate, mostly anonymous but very talented soccer players and their journey from the cobblestone streets of impoverished Belgrade neighborhoods to the formation of the national team before the very first World Cup in faraway Uruguay. So far away that the country's capital, Montevideo, seems more a distant dream than a familiar reality. Named after the city where the inaugural World Cup was held, director Dragan Bjelogrlić's adaptation of journalist Vladimir Stanković's best-selling book centers on the relationship between the two top players: natural talent and poor boy Tirke (Miloš Biković) and playboy superstar Moša (Petar Strugar).

The two young men eventually become friends when they are thrown together on the front line of the dominant local team, BSK Belgrade. As the club hierarchy is faced with the challenge of keeping the squad afloat, the opportunity arises to create a national team. However, team unity is strained when Tirke and Moša clash over beautiful women. Rosa (Danina Jeftić), the voluptuous, small-town innocent who adores Tirke, but her soccer-mad uncle conspires to set her up with Moša; and vampish Valerija (Nina Janković), a rich flapper who seduces Moša and finds much fun in pitting him against Tirke. The initial doubt that surrounded their personal and professional lives is transformed into a shared ambition to prove themselves in Montevideo; as a result, a story about friendship, enthusiasm, persistence and love for the game is unraveled.

== Cast ==
- Miloš Biković as Aleksandar "Tirke" Tirnanić
- Petar Strugar as Blagoje "Moša" Marjanović
- Nina Janković as Valerija, an eccentric Belgrade artist and painter, who hangs out among Belgrade's elite
- Danina Jeftić as Rosa, Tirke's love interest, who works at her uncle Rajko's tavern
- Mima Karadžić as Rajko, owner of the local tavern
- Branimir Brstina as Bogdan Brica
- Vojin Ćetković as Mihajlo "Andrejka" Andrejević
- Nebojša Ilić as Boško "Dunster" Simonović, who becomes the national team's coach later in the film
- Nikola Ðuričko as Živković
- Sergej Trifunović as Načelnik Komatina
- Viktor Savić as Milutin "Milutinac" Ivković
- Predrag Vasić as Little Stanoje, a shoeshine boy, he considers himself as Tirke's best friend, and he lives in poor conditions and has a leg deformity
- Srđan Todorović as Bora Jovanović
- Boda Ninković as Kustodić
- Anita Mančić as Đurđa
- Marko Živić as Isak
- Aleksandar Radojčić as Milorad "Balerina" Arsenijević
- Uroš Jovicić as Đorđe "Ðokica Nosonja" Vujadinović
- Bojan Krivokapić as Momčilo "Gusar" Đokić
- Andrija Kuzmanović as Milovan "Jakša" Jakšić
- Ivan Zekić as Ivan "Ivica" Bek
- Nenad Heraković as Dragoslav "Vampir" Mihajlović
- Aleksandar Filimonović as Ljubiša "Leo" Stevanović
- Rade Ćosić as Teofilo Spasojević
- Milan Nikitović as Branislav "Bane" Sekulić
- Tamara Dragićević as Eli
- Branislav Lečić as King Alexander

== Accolades ==
Event	Category	Winner/Nominee	Result
Fipresci Serbia 2010
Fipresci Serbia 2010	Best Actor	Miloš Biković	Nominated
Fipresci Serbia 2010	Best Actress	Danina Jeftić	Nominated
Fipresci Serbia 2010	Best Actress	Nina Janković	Nominated
Fipresci Serbia 2010	Best Picture	Intermedia Network	Won
Fipresci Serbia 2010	Best Director	Dragan Bjelogrlić	Won
Fipresci Serbia 2010	Best Director of Photography	Goran Volarević	Won
Fipresci Serbia 2010	Best Script	Srđan Dragojević and Ranko Božić	Won
Fipresci Serbia 2010	Best Production Design	Nemanja Petrović	Won
Popularity Oscars 2010	Best Picture	Intermedia Network	Won
THE MEN awards 2010	Project of the Year	Intermedia Network	Won
MTV Movie Awards 2011	Best Film	Intermedia Network	Won
33rd Moscow International Film Festival	Audience Choice Award	Intermedia Network	Won
58th International Pula Film Festival	Special Mention	Intermedia Network	Won
Sopot Film Festival 2011	Best Production Design	Nemanja Petrovic	Won
Lipetsk International Sports Film Festival ATLANT 2011	Best Feature Film About The Sport	Intermedia Network	Won
Leskovac International Film Festival LIFFE 2011	Audience Award for Best Picture	Intermedia Network	Won
Two Riversides Film and Art Festival 2011	Audience Choice Award	Intermedia Network	Won
10th International Festival of Sport Film Krasnogorski	Gran Prix	Intermedia Network	Won
30th World FICTS Challenge - Beijing Worldwide Final of Championship of Cinema and Sport Television	Guirlande D'Honneur	Intermedia Network	Won
Nis Film Festival 2011
Nis Film Festival 2011	Best Actor - 'Constantine The Great Award'	Miloš Biković	Won
Nis Film Festival 2011	Best Debut	Petar Strugar	Won
Nis Film Festival 2011	FIPRESCI Award	Viktor Savic	Won
Nis Film Festival 2011	Best Comic Role	Branimir Brstina	Won
Nis Film Festival 2011	Actor of the Evening	Predrag Vasic	Won

== DVD and TV series ==
The movie was released on DVD during 2011.

On 1 January 2012 it was broadcast on RTS 1, achieving stellar ratings with over 3.1 million viewers.

The extended version of the film, including 5 hours of footage unseen in the theatrical cut, began to be broadcast as the eponymous television series on RTS starting 13 February 2012, and onwards weekly every Monday in the 8pm prime time slot. Nine episodes aired, with the first season concluding on 9 April 2012.

The second series, titled Na putu za Montevideo, (season two) began on 31 December 2012, this time airing Sundays. The plot now moved to the preparations for the long trip to Uruguay. Nine more episodes were shown concluding on 10 March 2013.

In July 2013, the first series began airing in Croatia on RTL Televizija.

On 3 August 2013, Montevideo, God Bless You!, aired on the Chinese CCTV-6 network.

On 15 January 2014, the sequel feature film Montevideo, vidimo se! got released in theaters.

== See also ==
- List of submissions to the 84th Academy Awards for Best Foreign Language Film
- List of Serbian submissions for the Academy Award for Best Foreign Language Film

Awards
Preceded by Tamo i ovde	Serbian Oscar Of Popularity; The Movie of the Year; 2010	Succeeded by ?
