= History of the Serbia national football team =

The history of the Serbia national football team began in 1920, when Serbia played its first international match.

== Kingdom of Yugoslavia ==
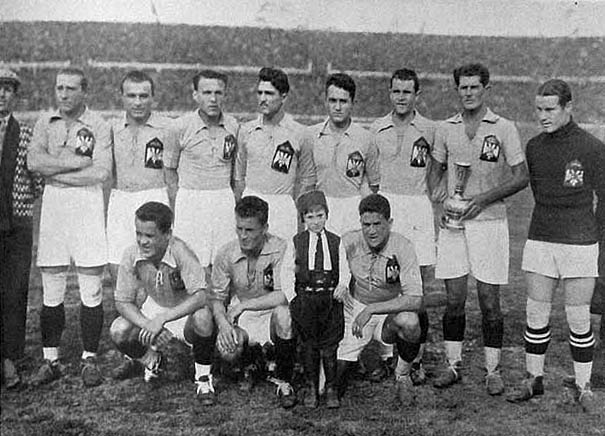
A Yugoslavia line-up in the 1930 FIFA World Cup

The first national team was in the kingdom that existed between the two world wars. The Football Federation of what was then the Kingdom of Serbs, Croats and Slovenes was founded in Zagreb in 1919 under the name Jugoslovenski nogometni savez (and admitted into FIFA), and the national team played its first international game at the Summer Olympics in Antwerp in 1920. The opponent was Czechoslovakia, and the historic starting eleven that represented Kingdom of SCS on its debut were: Dragutin Vrđuka, Vjekoslav Župančić, Jaroslav Šifer, Stanko Tavčar, Slavin Cindrić, Rudolf Rupec, Dragutin Vrag and Jovan Ružić. They lost by a large margin, 0–7, but nonetheless entered their names in the history books.

=== 1930 World Cup ===
In 1929, the country was renamed to Yugoslavia and the football association became Fudbalski Savez Jugoslavije and moved its headquarters to Belgrade. The national team participated at the 1930 FIFA World Cup, finishing in fourth place. In its first ever World Cup match in Montevideo's Parque Central, Yugoslavia managed a famous 2–1 win versus mighty Brazil, with the following starting eleven representing the country: Milovan Jakšić, Branislav Sekulić, Aleksandar Tirnanić, Milutin Ivković, Ivica Bek, Momčilo Đokić, Blagoje Marjanović, Milorad Arsenijević, Đorđe Vujadinović, Dragoslav Mihajlović, and Ljubiša Stefanović. The national team consisted of players based in Serbian football clubs, while the Zagreb Subassociation forbid players from Croatian clubs to play in the World Cup due to the relocation of the football association's headquarters from Zagreb to Belgrade.

== Socialist Yugoslavia ==
The federation and football overall was disrupted by World War II. After the war, a socialist federation was formed and the football federation reconstituted.

=== Silver Medal at 1948 and 1952 Olympics ===
Yugoslavia begin their football campaign by defeating Luxembourg 6–1, with five different players scoring the goals. In the quarter-finals and the semi-finals, they would take out Turkey and Great Britain by the same score of 3–1. In the final though, they would lose to Sweden.

Having a team with many players from the 1948 generation, Yugoslavia was a formidable side at the 1952 Summer Olympics and finished as runners-up behind the legendary Hungary national team. Against the Soviet Union, Yugoslavia was 5–1 up with 15 minutes of their first round match to go. The Yugoslavs, understandably, put their feet up. Arthur Ellis, the match referee, recorded what happened next in his book, The Final Whistle (London, 1963): "The USSR forced the most honourable draw ever recorded! [Vsevolod] Bobrov, their captain, scored a magnificent hat-trick. After the Soviet Union had reduced the lead to 5–2, he, almost single-handed, took the score to 5–5, scoring his third in the last minute. For once, use of the word sensational was justified." Although Bobrov's early goal in their replay presaged a miraculous recovery, Yugoslavia recovered sufficiently to put out their opponents easily in the second half.

=== 1960s through 1980s ===
Yugoslavia organized the 1976 European Championship played in Belgrade and Zagreb. The national team participated in eight World Cups and four Euros, and won the Olympic football tournament in 1960 at the Summer Games (they also finished second three times and third once).

=== Dissolution of Yugoslavia and UN sanctions ===
With the end of the Cold War, democratic principles were introduced to the country which brought about the end of Titoist rule. In the subsequent atmosphere, national tensions were heightened. At the Yugoslavia-Netherlands friendly in preparation for the 1990 World Cup, the Croatian crowd in Zagreb jeered the Yugoslav team and anthem and waved Dutch flags (owing to its resemblance to the Croatian tricolour). With the dissolution of Yugoslavia, the team split up and the remaining team of the Federal Republic of Yugoslavia (FRY) was banned from competing at Euro 92. The decision was made on 31 May 1992, just ten days before the competition commenced.

They had finished top of their qualifying group, but were unable to play in the competition due to United Nations Security Council Resolution 757. Their place was taken by Denmark, who went on to win the competition. Yugoslavia had also been drawn as the top seed in Group 5 of the European Zone in the qualifying tournament for the 1994 World Cup. FRY was barred from competing, rendering the group unusually weak.

== Serbia and Montenegro ==
=== 1998 World Cup ===
Although the Federal Republic of Yugoslavia, consisting of Serbia and Montenegro, was formed on 27 April 1992, its teams were banned from all international sporting events, including the national football team. Consequently, the national team did not play its first game as a new country before 23 December 1994, a friendly match played in Porto Alegre and in which Brazil won by the mark of 2–0. This was the first ever team composed of Serbian and Montenegrin players exclusively, while Slobodan Santrač, a former Yugoslavia national team player, was named the team's first ever manager. The next game was played only three days later, this time in Buenos Aires, resulting in 1–0 loss to Argentina. Despite two losses in two games, the team was honoured to play its first two games ever against such football powerhouses.

Also due to the United Nations international sanctions, the team could not participate in 1994 World Cup qualifying nor the Euro 1996 qualifying process.

On 31 March 1995, the team recorded its first official win in history, a 1–0 friendly against Uruguay, simultaneously marking the team's first ever home game, played at Stadion Crvena Zvezda in Belgrade, and the first ever goal scored, courtesy of Savo Milošević. Slightly more than one year later, the team recorded its first ever win in a World Cup qualifying tournament in its first game in such a tournament, a 3–1 win over the Faroe Islands. Shortly after, the team also recorded its biggest win in history, once again against the Faroe Islands, 8–1. Yugoslavia finished second in Group 6, just behind Spain, meaning it had to go through the play-off system in order to qualify. Yugoslavia was paired up with Hungary, and what was believed would be a tough matchup turned out to be an easy win for Yugoslavia, 7–1 in Budapest and 5–0 in Belgrade, for an aggregate score of 12–1. This was enough to secure Yugoslavia its first ever World Cup appearance as a new country.

The 1998 World Cup seeding had Yugoslavia ranked in 21st position, but the Yugoslavia national team went to France as one of the shadow favorites for the World Cup. The New York Times stated that Yugoslavia could easily be a semi-finalist in that year's World Cup. The justification for such an estimation was partially found in the names of the Yugoslav players, members of great European teams and proven footballers. The draw put the team in Group F alongside Germany, the United States, and Iran. Yugoslavia won its first game 1–0 against Iran thanks to a goal from defender Siniša Mihajlović. The next game was a draw for Yugoslavia. After leading Germany 2–0, last game's hero, Mihajlović, scored an unlucky own goal following a German freekick, and Oliver Bierhoff equalised at 2–2 with only about ten minutes to the match. Nonetheless, Yugoslavia responded in the next game against the United States and won 1–0 due to an early goal in Nantes. Yugoslavia made easy work of Group 6, but despite an excellent record, the game against Germany would prove costly as Germany won the group thanks to a better goal difference.

Due to their second position, Yugoslavia saw itself face the Netherlands in the Round of 16. Yugoslavia entered in the match with a sole attacker, but its defensive tactics proved unsuccessful as Dennis Bergkamp put the Netherlands in front in the 38th minute. Immediately following the start of the second half, Yugoslavia pressured the Dutch, who inevitably conceded a header from Slobodan Komljenović. However, the turning point of this match was a penalty awarded to Yugoslavia after Vladimir Jugović was fouled in the penalty area. Predrag Mijatović's shot dazzled Edwin van der Sar, but not the crossbar, and the scoreline remained the same at 1–1. Such an event demoralized the Yugoslavs, as the Dutch took the initiative. In the late seconds of the game, as everybody was preparing for extra time, Edgar Davids' shot towards the Yugoslav net from a distance of 20 meters and beat goalkeeper Ivica Kralj, to the pure disbelief of the Yugoslav players and fans. This marked the end of Yugoslavia's run in the 1998 World Cup, since there was not much time left to do anything.

Unlucky events forced Yugoslavia out of the tournament, but the team definitely demonstrated its great ability and proved it had a spot among the world's best teams. This was also reflected in the FIFA World Rankings following the 1998 FIFA World Cup, in which Yugoslavia was constantly ranked in the Top 10 for a long period of time.

=== Euro 2000 ===
The draw for the Euro 2000 qualifiers saw many eyebrows raised as first-seeded Yugoslavia was drawn in a group with Croatia, thus marking the first games between the two teams after the breakup of Yugoslavia. The other teams in the group were the Republic of Ireland, Macedonia, and Malta. When the qualifiers began, the coach was Milan Živadinović, but in July 1999 he resigned and was replaced by Vujadin Boškov.

The team started with a 1–0 win over Ireland in Belgrade, before beating Malta 3–0 in Ta' Qali. The home fixture against the Maltese followed, but was moved to Thessaloniki, Greece due to the NATO bombing of Yugoslavia. The team nonetheless won 4–1. The first, highly anticipated match against Croatia took place in Belgrade shortly after the bombing ended, and was interrupted due to a power outage at the beginning of the second half, resuming after 43 minutes and eventually finishing 0–0. A 2–1 defeat against Ireland in Dublin was followed by victories home and away against Macedonia (3–1 and 4–2 respectively), meaning that Yugoslavia needed to win its final qualifier against Croatia in Zagreb, or to draw with Ireland failing to beat Macedonia in Skopje, in order to qualify automatically for Euro 2000. In the event, Ireland conceded an injury-time equaliser, meaning that Yugoslavia's 2–2 draw with the Croatians was good enough.

The draw for the finals placed Yugoslavia in Group C along with Spain, Norway and another former Yugoslav republic, Slovenia. The Slovenians took a surprise 3–0 lead in the first game at the Stade du Pays de Charleroi, but three goals in six second-half minutes enabled Yugoslavia to secure a 3–3 draw. The team then beat Norway 1–0 in Liège, thanks to an early Savo Milošević backheel strike. The final group game, against Spain in Bruges, saw the Yugoslavs take the lead three times, before a Gaizka Mendieta penalty and an Alfonso strike in injury-time secured a dramatic 4–3 win for the Spaniards and top spot in the group. Yugoslavia nonetheless finished second, level on points with Norway but ranked ahead due to its victory in Liège. In each of the three games, the team had one player sent off (Siniša Mihajlović, Mateja Kežman, and Slaviša Jokanović, respectively).

In the quarter-finals, Yugoslavia was once again paired with the Netherlands. Unlike the last time, the co-hosts made easy work of Yugoslavia, winning 6–1 in Rotterdam with Patrick Kluivert scoring a hat-trick.

One of the few bright spots of Yugoslav team in the whole tournament was Savo Milošević, who was crowned the joint top scorer of the tournament, alongside Patrick Kluivert. Both players scored five goals, although Milošević played one game fewer.

=== 2002 World Cup campaign ===
The 2002 qualifiers marked the first time that Yugoslavia failed to reach a major tournament ever since its return to the big stage after the UN sanctions. The problems started with the major political turmoil in the country as well in the Yugoslav FA, which prompted the new coach Ilija Petković to resign only after one game (2–0 away victory against Luxembourg).

Milovan Đorić took over the team, but under his leadership, the team managed only two draws (1–1 at home vs. Switzerland and also 1–1 away in Slovenia, in both games the opponents managed to equalise in late stages of the game) and a 0–1 home loss to Russia (which marked the team's first home defeat in official matches). After Ðorić's resignation, a three-man commission, consisting of Dejan Savićević, Vujadin Boškov, and Ivan Ćurković, took over the coaching duties, until Savićević ultimately took over on his own. The team managed to bounce back with a draw in Russia and a win in Switzerland, but failed to defeat Slovenia in the penultimate game, thus ended the qualifiers in third position.

=== 2006 World Cup ===
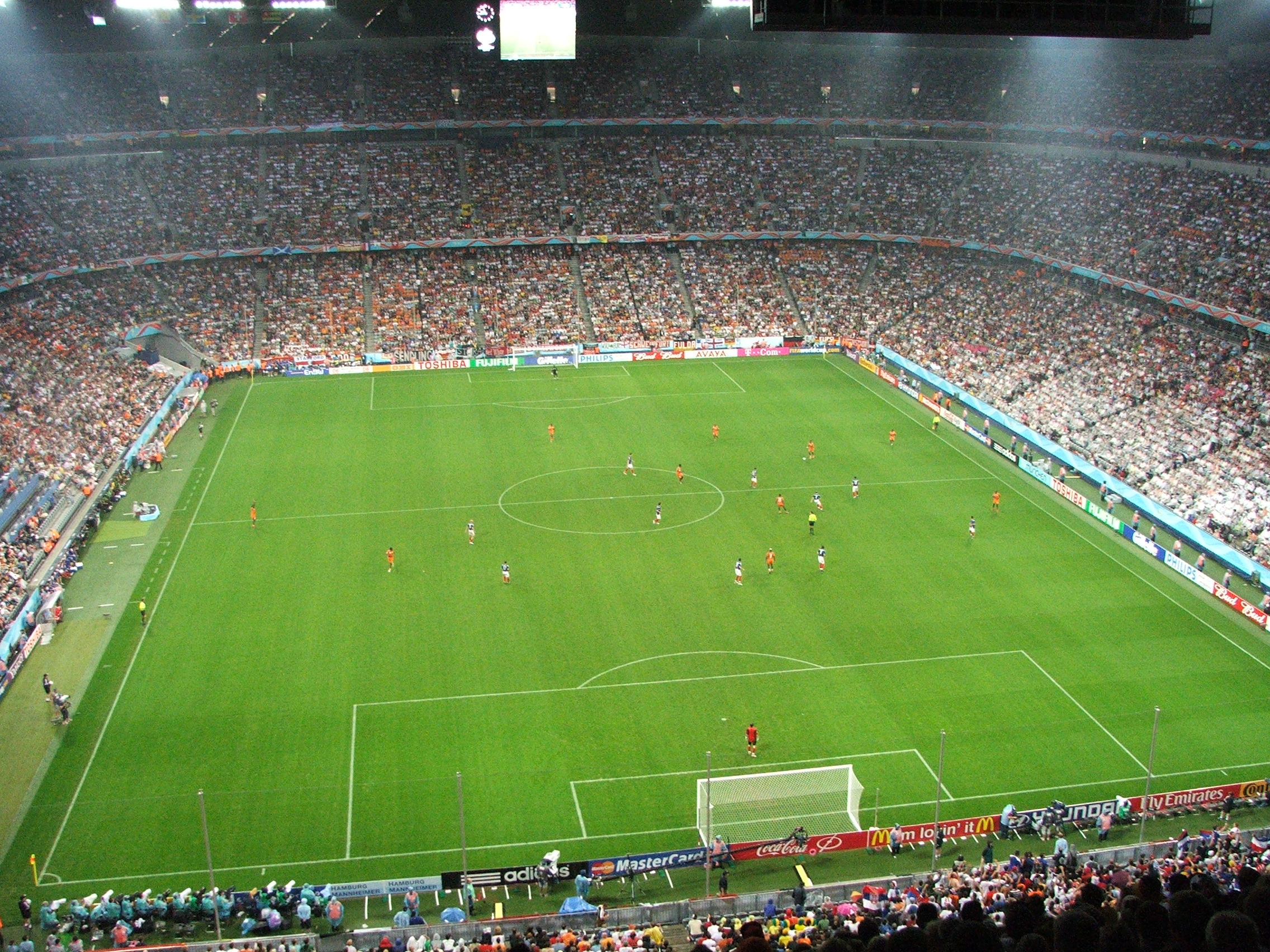
Serbia and Montenegro and Côte d'Ivoire playing in the Allianz Arena at the 2006 FIFA World Cup

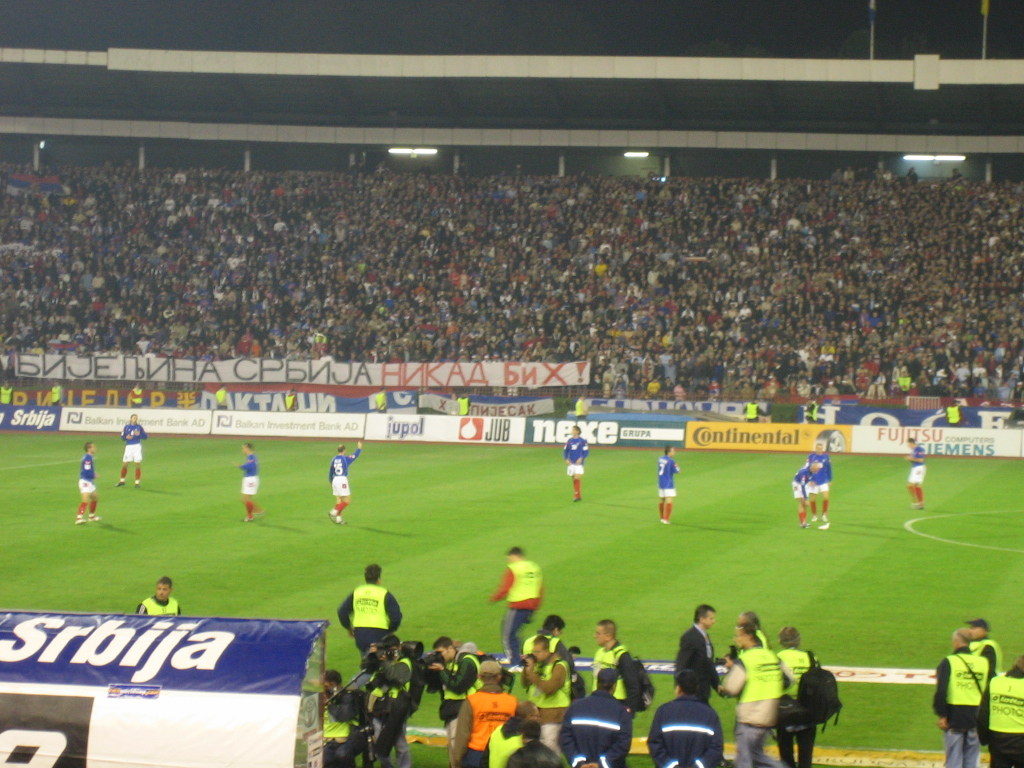
Serbia and Montenegro against Bosnia and Herzegovina in qualifiers for 2006 World Cup

After Savićević's disastrous spell as coach of Yugoslavia, the country went under a political transformation, and Ilija Petković became the newly named Serbia and Montenegro's new coach. Initially, the team under his lead experienced dragging failure in the Euro 2004 qualifiers while competing for the first time as Serbia and Montenegro. Despite drawing both games against group favorites and eventual group winners Italy and winning both games against runners-up Wales, Serbia and Montenegro failed to qualify, mostly due to an embarrassing 2–2 home draw and 2–1 away loss to Azerbaijan.

Qualifying for the 2006 World Cup, however, was different. Serbia and Montenegro began the campaign by finishing first with an undefeated record in their qualification group ahead of favourites Spain. The Serbia and Montenegro team also allowed only one goal in the ten matches, the best defensive record of all 51 teams participating in qualification.

For the 2006 qualifiers, Serbia and Montenegro was drawn in a group with Spain, Belgium, Bosnia and Herzegovina, Lithuania and San Marino. Led once again by Ilija Petković as coach, Serbia and Montenegro played some impressive defensive football—the "Famous Four" defense, consisting of Nemanja Vidić, Mladen Krstajić, Goran Gavrančić, and Ivica Dragutinović, with Dragoslav Jevrić as goalkeeper, conceded only one goal in ten games, finishing first with a 6–4–0 record, ahead of Spain.

On 3 June 2006, following a referendum, Montenegro declared its independence from Serbia. As the World Cup was about to start, it was decided that the Serbia and Montenegro team that had qualified for the tournament would compete, with the split into separate teams representing the new countries of Montenegro and Serbia to take place once the team was no longer in the tournament.

In the group stage, Serbia and Montenegro lost their opening game to joint group favourite, the Netherlands. The final score was 1–0 after Arjen Robben scored the only goal of the game. They also lost their second game to Argentina 6–0, Serbia and Montenegro's worst ever international result. With the team's two losses and with Netherlands and Argentina winning both their games, Serbia and Montenegro could no longer qualify for the knockout matches, and was playing for pride alone in their final group game against Ivory Coast. Despite having a 2–0 lead for much of the first half, the Elephants managed to come back and win 3–2, leaving Serbia and Montenegro with a disappointing 0–0–3 World Cup run.

== Serbia ==
After Montenegro declared independence, Serbia marked independence with a 3–1 away victory over the Czech Republic. Danko Lazović's, Marko Pantelić's and Aleksandar Trišović's goals led Serbia to victory on this match.

=== UEFA Euro 2008 qualifying ===
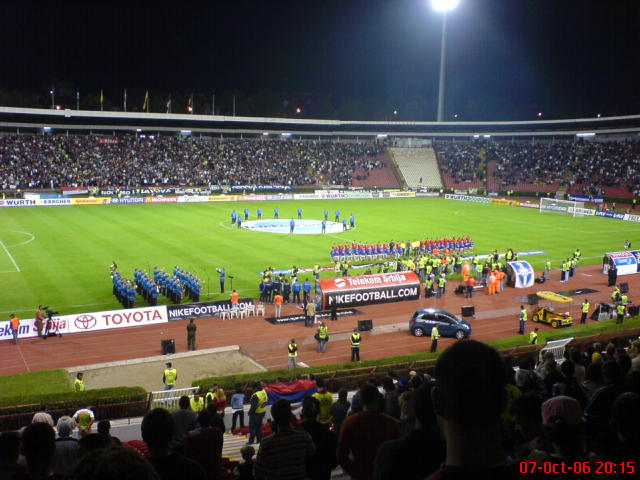
Serbia against Belgium, on 7 October 2006

The 2008 UEFA European Football Championship qualifying campaign began with a 1–0 victory over Azerbaijan by Nikola Žigić's goal in the 72nd minute on 6 September 2006. Four days later, Serbia drew with Poland 1–1. Serbia made a two victories in October: 1–0 over Belgium and 3–0 over Armenia. In 6 matches, Serbia stayed undefeated in 2006 (4 victories, 2 draws). In the first qualifying match in 2007, Serbia unexpectedly lost 1–2 from Kazakhstan in Almaty, and four days later (28 March 2007) made a draw in front of 52,000 fans at Rajko Mitić Stadium against Portugal. On 2 June 2007, Serbia made a 2–0 victory over Finland in Helsinki. In August, he lost from Belgium 2–3 away, Zdravko Kuzmanović scored (his first) two goals. After a three draws, Serbia demolished Azerbaijan with 6–1 in Baku. On 21 November 2007, Serbia draw 2–2 at home with Poland in the front of 3,000 fans. Three days later, with a low attendance (less than 1,000) at Partizan Stadium, Serbia defeated Kazakhstan by own goal in the 79th minute in the last match of this qualifying cycle. Serbia finished third, three points behind runners-up Portugal and Group A winners Poland. Serbia's first ever foreign coach Javier Clemente was sacked after the failure.

=== Golden years (2008–2010) ===
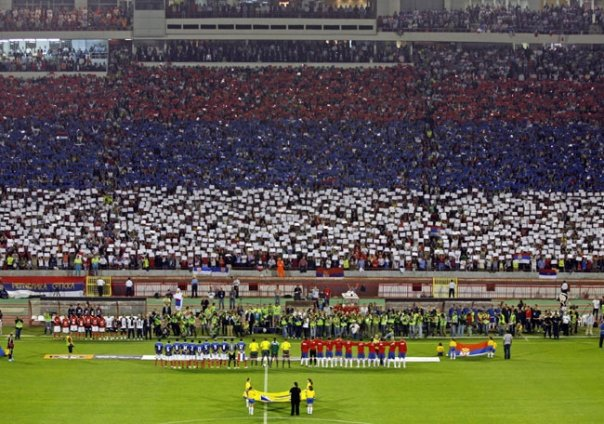
Atmosphere at the start of match vs. France, 9 September 2009

Serbia replaced Clemente with Miroslav Đukić, but he left the position on 19 August of the following year without having played any official games. Subsequent to Ðukić's rapid departure, who led Serbia on five friendly matches and made three defeats and two draws, Radomir Antić was appointed coach. Serbia's World Cup qualification campaign began on 6 September 2008. Serbia defeated Faroe Islands, by own goal in 30th minute and Nikola Žigić's goal in 88th minute. Four days later, Serbia lost from 2006 FIFA World Cup runners-up France 1–2 on Stade de France. A month later, Serbia defeated Lithuania 3–0 with the goals scored by Branislav Ivanović Miloš Krasić and Nikola Žigić. On 15 October 2008, Serbia broken Austria 3–1 in Vienna in the front of 48,000 fans. Krasić, Milan Jovanović and Ivan Obradović scored goals for 9 minutes (15th, 18th and 24th). By the end of the year, Serbia played one match in November and one in December. First, in November, Serbia demolish Bulgaria 6–1 in Belgrade. Savo Milošević, the second top goalscorer of all time in Serbia national team, scored twice and missed two penalties in his last match for national team. Serbia lost against Poland in Antalya, in December 0–1. In first match in 2009, Serbia made a huge victory over Romania in Constanţa. Romania not defeated in Constanţa seven years, before this match. On 6 June 2009, Serbia defeated Austria 1–0 in the front of 52,000 fans at Rajko Mitić Stadium. Nenad Milijaš scored the only goal, in 7th minute, from penalty spot. Four days later, Serbia made an expected victory (2–0) over Faroe Islands in Tórshavn. On 9 September 2009, Serbia drew 1–1 with world runners-up, France in front of almost 50,000 fans. Nenad Milijaš scored the only goal for Eagles, in the 12th minute, from penalty spot, like against Austria three months before. On 10 October 2009, Serbia made a huge victory 5–0 against Romania and secured placement at 2010 FIFA World Cup. In last match of this qualifying cycle, Lithuania defeated Serbia 2–1 in Marijampolė. In November, Serbia defeated Northern Ireland and South Korea in Belfast and London, 1–0 both matches.

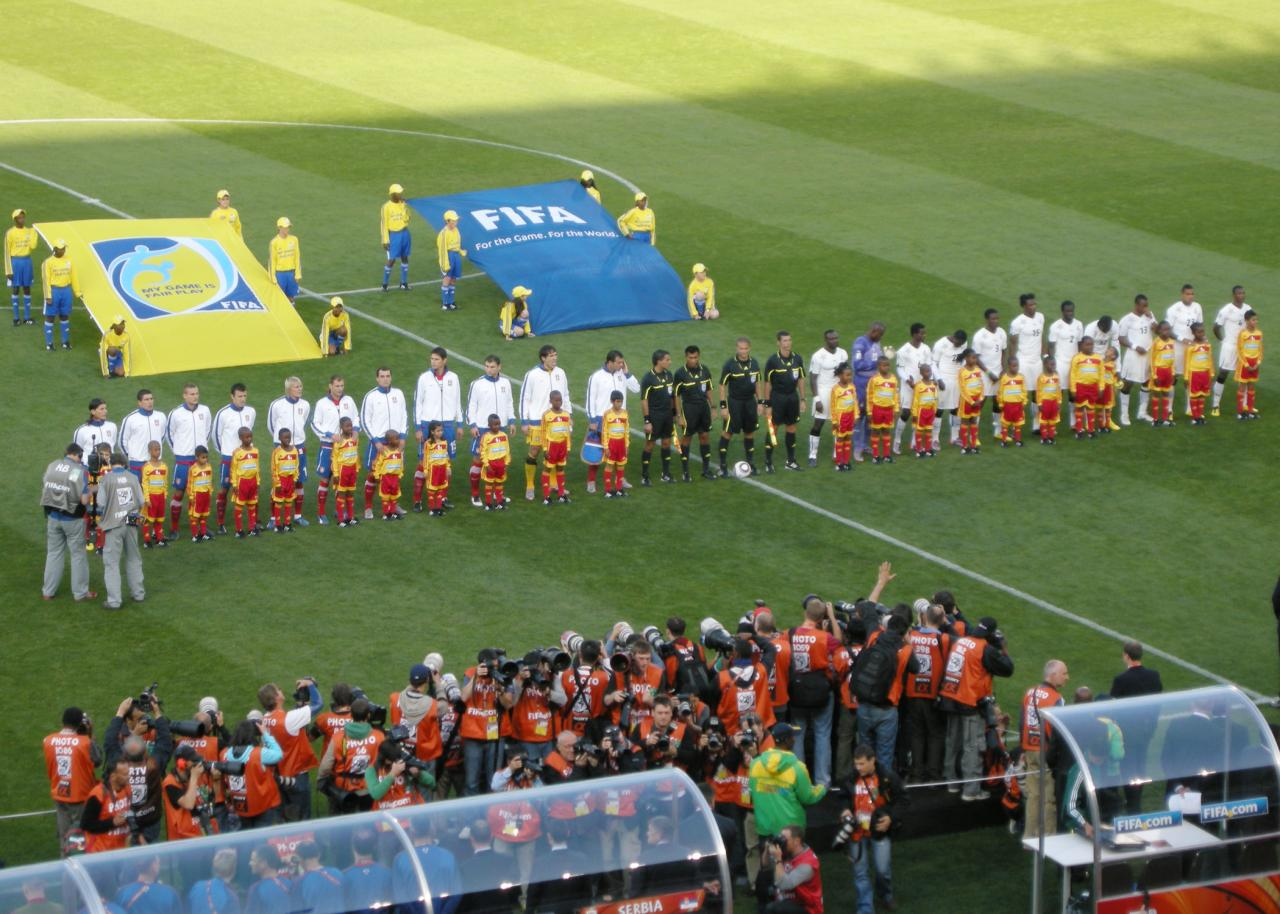
Serbia vs. Ghana, 13 June 2010

Serbia placed into Group D with Germany, team also faced 2010 Africa Cup of Nations runners-up Ghana, and Australia.

Their opening group game was against Ghana and chances came to both sides but a red card to Aleksandar Luković and a handball by substitute Zdravko Kuzmanović in the second half gave Ghana a penalty to take all three points at the death. Asamoah Gyan converted eight minutes from full-time and Serbia were defeated 1–0. In Serbia's second group match, they sensationally defeated Germany by a score of 1–0 with an acrobatic goal by Milan Jovanović late in the first half. FIFA's official YouTube channel called the win "the most famous day in Serbia's footballing history". Serbia only needed a single point to reach the knockout stages but were defeated by Australia 2–1 in an entertaining match where Serbia's dominance in the first half and in periods of the second half would have made it look like a Serbia victory. Australia scored 2 goals in the second half through Tim Cahill and Brett Holman. A late Marko Pantelić goal served only as a consolation. They finished last in the group.

=== Disappointing qualifications (2011–2016) ===
After game against Australia and elimination from World Cup, Serbia start 2012 UEFA European Football Championship qualifying campaign. The qualifying stage began with Radomir Antić as coach and finished with Vladimir Petrović. Serbia and Antić started the first two games positively with a 3–0 win away to Faroe Islands and a 1–1 draw at home to Slovenia but this result brought the end of Antić's reign as the country's coach. New coach Petrović faced setbacks immediately with an embarrassing 3–1 loss at home to Estonia and an abandoned match resulting in a 3–0 loss to Italy due to crowd trouble from the Serbian away supporters in Genoa. Serbia returned to form with a 2–1 win at home over Northern Ireland but could only manage a 1–1 draw away to Estonia. Afterwards, Serbia won back to back games with a 1–0 win away to Northern Ireland and a crucial 3–1 win at home against Faroe Islands. These results put Serbia in pole position to confirm a play-off spot behind Italy. Serbia needed a win at home against Italy to confirm a play-off spot but their efforts only resulted in a 1–1 draw. The team, however, still had one more chance to confirm a play-off place when they faced Slovenia away. This game was a must win even though Serbia had a superior goal difference over Estonia, a draw was not good enough for progression. Serbia played positively and created a number of chances during the game but a long-range goal put Slovenia up 1–0 at half time. The Serbians then failed to convert numerous chances that they had in the second half, notably Nemanja Vidić's penalty miss midway through the second half. Serbia left empty handed after a 1–0 loss and exited the tournament for the third time in a row during the qualifying group stages, missing out by one point behind Estonia. Vladimir Petrović was sacked after the team's failure to qualify.

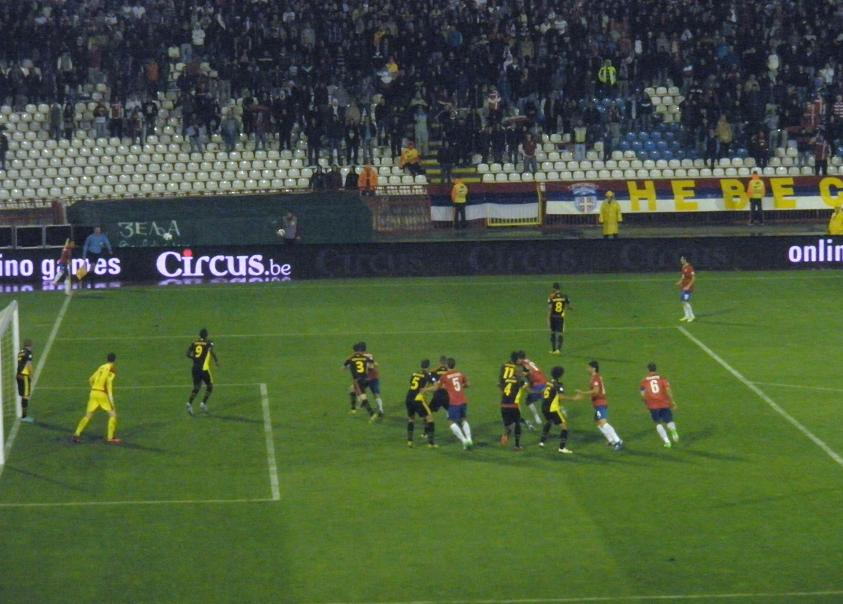
Serbia vs. Belgium,

Dejan Stanković and Nemanja Vidić announced that they were retiring from international football. This meant that Serbia had lost two key players and that a new era had started. Branislav Ivanović became the new captain. Siniša Mihajlović, a former member of the national team, was appointed as the coach on 24 April 2012. Serbia was drawn in Group A in qualification for 2014 FIFA World Cup, together with Croatia, Belgium, Scotland, Macedonia, and Wales. The team began the qualification campaign with a goalless draw with Scotland in Glasgow and a 6–1 win over Wales in Novi Sad. In the next two games, Serbia suffered two defeats, from Macedonia in (0–1) and Belgium in Belgrade (0–3). In 2013, on 22 March, Serbia played in Zagreb against Croatia. The game was highly anticipated in both countries due to their rivalry both on and off the pitch. Croatia won 2–0 and sent Serbia down on the table. Serbia then defeated Scotland 2–0 at home in a crucial qualifier, though their World Cup hopes were taken away after a 2–1 defeat to Belgium. Serbia drew with Croatia 1–1 in the corresponding fixture at home in a spiteful affair, where 18-year-old Aleksandar Mitrović scored an equalizer in the second-half after Mario Mandžukić opened the scoring. They then defeated Wales 0–3 in Cardiff. Dejan Stanković's farewell game was completed in a friendly against Japan, which Serbia won 2–0. He finished his career with 103 appearances for the national team, a record previously held by Savo Milošević, with 102 appearances. Serbia finished qualifying with a 5–1 home win against Macedonia, putting them in third in the group, three points from a playoff spot behind Croatia and group winners Belgium.

Dutch Dick Advocaat was appointed as the coach in July 2014. Serbia was drawn in Group I in qualification for UEFA Euro 2016, together with Portugal, Denmark, Albania and Armenia. Advocaat started with a draw in a friendly 1–1 game against France. The team began qualification with a 1–1 draw against Armenia in Yerevan. In the next abandoned game against Albania in Belgrade, Serbia was originally awarded with a 3–0 victory, but was later deducted three points. On 14 November 2014, Serbia played against Denmark in Belgrade and lost, 1–3. After this game, Advocaat left, whereupon Radovan Ćurčić was announced as a new coach on 18 November. In 2015, Serbia's first match was a qualifying match against Portugal in Lisbon, during which Serbia lost 2–1, cutting their chances for qualification to Euro 2016. On 13 June 2015, Serbia played a qualifying match against Denmark in Copenhagen, losing 2–0. On 10 July, the Court of Arbitration for Sport (CAS) announced that it had awarded a 0–3 victory to Albania in the abandoned match held on 14 October 2014, upholding Serbia's three-point penalization. As a result, Serbia became mathematically eliminated from Euro 2016 qualification. On 4 September 2015, Serbia reached first victory in these qualifications, 2–0 over Armenia. On 8 October, Serbia made a huge victory over rival Albania in Elbasan. Aleksandar Kolarov's and Adem Ljajić's goals in 91st and 94th minute led Serbia to the victory. In the table of Group I, Serbia finished second to last place with four points in a five team group.

=== The return ===
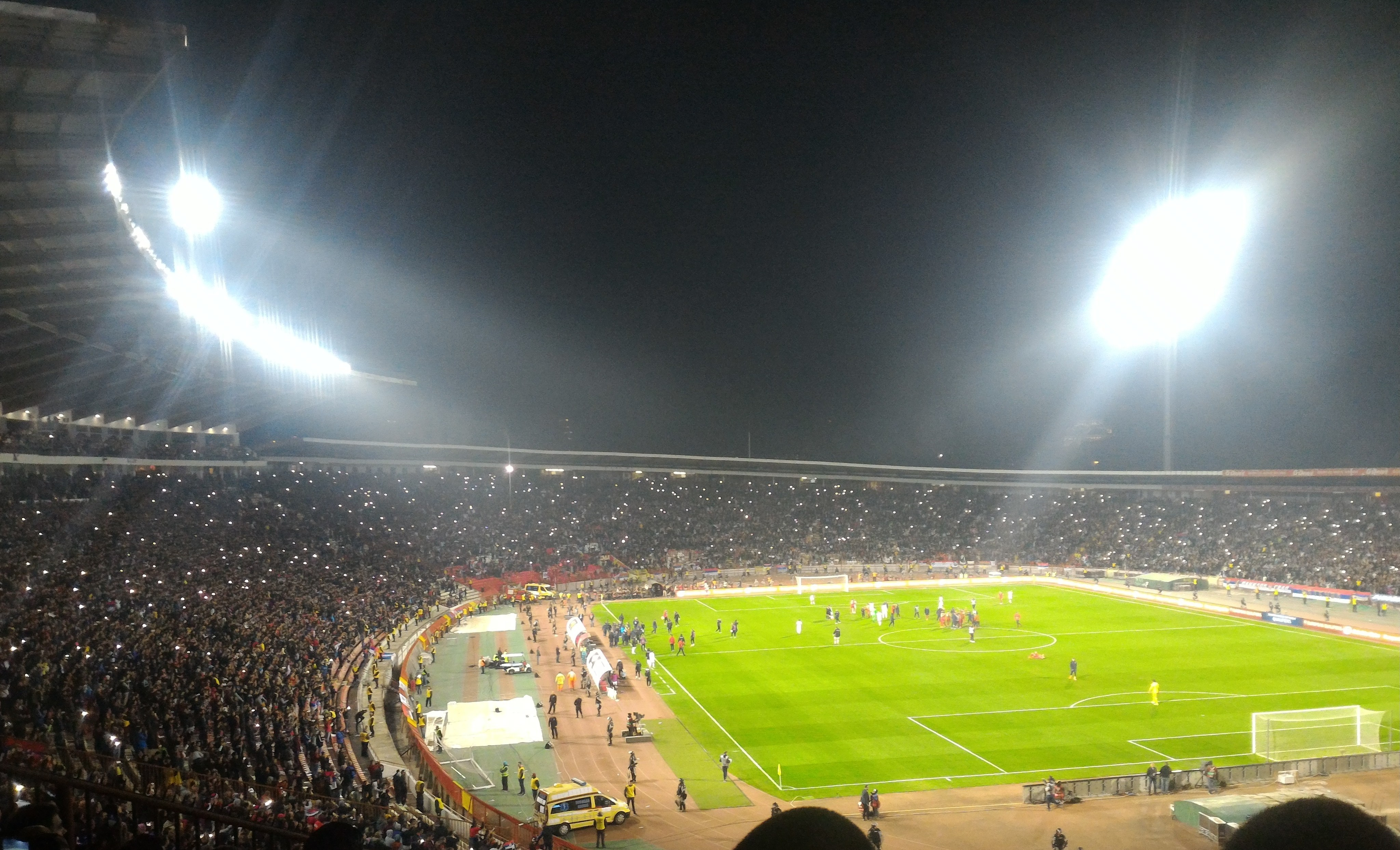
Serbia - Georgia 1–0, World Cup 2018 qualification match at Red Star Stadium

In first match for 2018 FIFA World Cup qualification, Serbia started off their campaign with a 2–2 draw against Ireland at the Rajko Mitic Stadium. Republic of Ireland take the lead in 3rd minute. The Eagles equalized by Filip Kostić's goal in 62nd minute and seven minutes later take the lead after Dušan Tadić successfully completed the penalty. Conceded goal in 80th minute has costed Serbia three points. One month later, Serbia made a first victory, over Moldova in Chișinău. Filip Kostić scored first goal on the match again, this time in 19th minute. Captain Branislav Ivanović scored in 37th minute. Dušan Tadić scored in 59th minute and with one goal and two assists helped Serbia to beat Moldova 3–0. Three days later, on 9 October 2016, Serbia defeated Austria (3–2) at Rajko Mitić Stadium and made very important victory. Brace from Aleksandar Mitrović in 6th and 23rd minute and Dušan Tadić's in 74th minute masterpiece helped Serbia to win the match. On 12 November 2016, Aleksandar Mitrović's goal in 86th minute, helped Serbia to take a point against Euro 2016 semi-finalists, Wales in Cardiff. On 24 March, in first match in 2017, Serbia defeat 3–1 Georgia in Tbilisi. Dušan Tadić scored the equalizer, from penalty spot in 44th minute. Aleksandar Mitrović with beautiful goal give Serbia lead in 64th minute. Mijat Gaćinović replaced Filip Kostić 81st minute, and scored a goal five minutes later in his first game for national team. On 11 June 2017, Aleksandar Mitrović scored the only goal for Eagles, against Wales (1–1) in the front of 47,000 fans at Rajko Mitić Stadium. On 2 September 2017, Serbia defeated Moldova 3–0 at Partizan Stadium. Mijat Gaćinović scored 20th minute and ten minutes later assisted for Aleksandar Kolarov's first goal in these qualifications. Aleksandar Mitrović scored the third goal for Serbia on this match and continued his amazing performance in these qualifications (six goals in last five qualification matches). Three days later, Serbia defeated Ireland in Dublin 1–0 and come on the step of 2018 FIFA World Cup. Aleksandar Kolarov scored a goal in 55th minute. Nikola Maksimović was sent off thirteen minutes later and Eagles played almost half an hour with a player less. Serbia needed a victory on one of two remaining matches. On 6 October, at Ernst-Happel-Stadion in Wien Serbia has lost 3–2. The Eagles take the lead in 11th minute, after Luka Milivojević's first goal for national team, but Austria reversed result in 76th minute, but Nemanja Matić has scored the equalizer seven minutes later. In 89th minute, Austrians scored the winning goal. Three days later at Rajko Mitić Stadium, Aleksandar Prijović's goal in 74th minute against Georgia sent Serbia to the 2018 FIFA World Cup. A couple days after match, coach Slavoljub Muslin was sacked. Mladen Krstajić succeeded Muslin as coach of the Serbia national team, initially as a caretaker. He led team on two matches in November. In first match, he made victory against China 2–0, but in second Serbia draw 1–1 with South Korea. In December, it was announced he would take on the role permanently and at least until the end of the 2018 FIFA World Cup. In March, Serbia played two matches against two strongest African teams. In first match, in Turin, Serbia lost 1–2 against Morocco. Dušan Tadić scored goal for Serbia, in his 50th match for national team. On 27 March, Serbia beat 2–0 Nigeria in London. Mitrović scored two goals for Serbia. In first week of June, Serbia played two matches in Graz against South American teams. In first match, Serbia lost 0–1 against Chile, but in second they demolished Bolivia with 5–1. Serbia scored four goals in first half. Mitrović scored first hat-trick in national team.
