= Igor Duljaj =

Serbian footballer (born 1979)

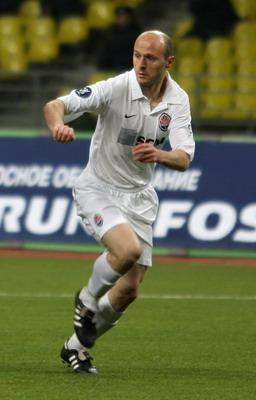
- Duljaj with Shakhtar Donetsk in 2009

Personal information
- Full name: Igor Duljaj
- Date of birth: 29 November 1979 (age 46)
- Place of birth: Topola, SR Serbia, SFR Yugoslavia
- Height: 1.75 m (5 ft 9 in)
- Position: Defensive midfielder

Youth career
- 1990–1997: Partizan

Senior career*
Years	Team	Apps	(Gls)
1997–2004	Partizan	154	(4)
2004–2010	Shakhtar Donetsk	118	(5)
2010–2014	Sevastopol	82	(3)
Total		354	(12)

International career
2000–2007	Serbia (Note: Including 35 caps for Serbia and Montenegro (known as FR Yugoslavia until 2003))	47	(0)

Managerial career
- 2016–2019: Shakhtar Donetsk (assistant)
- 2019–2022: Partizan (assistant)
- 2022–2023: Teleoptik
- 2023–2024: Partizan
- * Club domestic league appearances and goals

Igor Duljaj (Serbian Cyrillic: Игор Дуљај; born 29 October 1979) is a Serbian retired footballer who played as a defensive midfielder. He is best remembered for his tenacious playing style and stamina.

During his footballing career, Duljaj played with only three clubs, namely Partizan, Shakhtar Donetsk and Sevastopol. He won 14 major trophies at club level, including the 2008–09 UEFA Cup.

At international level, Duljaj earned 47 caps for Serbia (and its predecessors). He represented Serbia and Montenegro at the 2006 FIFA World Cup.

== Club career ==
Born in Topola, Duljaj was spotted by Partizan in 1990. He initially traveled to Belgrade to attend training sessions for several years, before permanently relocating to the capital city. Duljaj is probably the best defensive midfielder who came out of the youth academy of Partizan in the 90s as he passed all club selections. In the 1997–98 season, Duljaj was promoted to the main squad, appearing in five league games and scoring once. He became a first-team regular in his third year as a senior, collecting 41 appearances in all competitions while scoring one goal in the league. Over the course of the next three seasons, Duljaj was an irreplaceable member of the team that won one national cup and back-to-back championships in 2002 and 2003. He subsequently helped the side progress to the group stage of the 2003–04 UEFA Champions League, eliminating Newcastle United in the last qualifying round.

In February 2004, Duljaj was transferred to Shakhtar Donetsk. He penned a five-year contract with the club, rejoining his former Partizan teammate Zvonimir Vukić. Over the following seven seasons, Duljaj won four Ukrainian Premier League titles, two Ukrainian Cups, two Ukrainian Super Cups, and one UEFA Cup. He amassed a total of 195 appearances in all competitions and scored six goals.

In July 2010, Duljaj signed with fellow Ukrainian club Sevastopol. He spent four seasons with the side, two in the top flight and two in the second tier, before retiring from the game.

== International career ==
Duljaj was capped for FR Yugoslavia at under-18 and under-21 level. He also represented the country at the Millennium Super Soccer Cup in early 2001. Led by manager Ilija Petković, Duljaj appeared in all five of his team's games and scored two goals, helping the side win the tournament. However, these caps are not officially recognized by FIFA.

Previously, Duljaj made his full international debut for FR Yugoslavia in a 2–1 friendly loss against Romania on 15 November 2000. He went on to represent his country on 52 occasions, including 5 unofficial at the 2001 Millennium Super Soccer Cup and being a member of the team at the 2006 FIFA World Cup.

== Post-playing career ==
In the summer of 2016, Duljaj joined the coaching staff at Shakhtar Donetsk, becoming an assistant to manager Paulo Fonseca.

In December 2019, it was announced that Duljaj would be joining Savo Milošević's staff at Partizan.

On 16 August 2022, it was announced that Duljaj became the new manager at Teleoptik. Duljaj finished in fourth place with Teleoptik in the first part of the 2022–23 Serbian League Belgrade season.

After the resignation of Gordan Petrić at the end of February 2023, Duljaj was appointed head coach of Partizan. With five matches left before the end of the 2023–24 season, he was replaced by a unanimous decision made at a meeting of the club's Board of Directors. Instead of Duljaj, Albert Nađ, who was previously part of the coaching staff as an assistant, was appointed as the head coach.

== Personal life ==
Duljaj has two brothers, Joakim and Nenad. Together they run the Duljaj Football Academy in their hometown of Topola.

== Career statistics ==
=== Club ===
Appearances and goals by club, season and competition
Club	Season	League		Cup		Continental		Other		Total	
Club	Season	Apps	Goals	Apps	Goals	Apps	Goals	Apps	Goals	Apps	Goals
Partizan	1997–98	5	1	2	0	0	0	—		7	1
Partizan	1998–99	15	0	5	0	2	0	—		22	0
Partizan	1999–00	32	1	2	0	7	0	—		41	1
Partizan	2000–01	28	1	5	0	4	0	—		37	1
Partizan	2001–02	29	1	1	1	4	0	—		34	2
Partizan	2002–03	31	0	3	0	7	0	—		41	0
Partizan	2003–04	14	0	1	0	10	0	—		25	0
Partizan	Total	154	4	19	1	34	0	—		207	5
Shakhtar Donetsk	2003–04	9	0	2	0	0	0	—		11	0
Shakhtar Donetsk	2004–05	24	2	7	0	13	0	0	0	44	2
Shakhtar Donetsk	2005–06	24	0	1	0	10	0	1	0	36	0
Shakhtar Donetsk	2006–07	20	1	4	0	7	0	1	0	32	1
Shakhtar Donetsk	2007–08	14	1	7	1	6	0	1	0	28	2
Shakhtar Donetsk	2008–09	13	1	2	0	10	0	1	0	26	1
Shakhtar Donetsk	2009–10	14	0	2	0	2	0	—		18	0
Shakhtar Donetsk	Total	118	5	25	1	48	0	4	0	195	6
Sevastopol	2010–11	23	0	1	0	—		—		24	0
Sevastopol	2011–12	28	2	2	0	—		—		30	2
Sevastopol	2012–13	22	1	5	0	—		—		27	1
Sevastopol	2013–14	9	0	1	0	—		—		10	0
Sevastopol	Total	82	3	9	0	—		—		91	3
Career total		354	12	53	2	82	0	4	0	493	14

=== International ===
Appearances and goals by national team and year
National team	Year	Apps	Goals
FR Yugoslavia; Serbia and Montenegro; Serbia	2000	2	0
FR Yugoslavia; Serbia and Montenegro; Serbia	2001	2	0
FR Yugoslavia; Serbia and Montenegro; Serbia	2002	7	0
FR Yugoslavia; Serbia and Montenegro; Serbia	2003	6	0
FR Yugoslavia; Serbia and Montenegro; Serbia	2004	5	0
FR Yugoslavia; Serbia and Montenegro; Serbia	2005	8	0
FR Yugoslavia; Serbia and Montenegro; Serbia	2006	11	0
FR Yugoslavia; Serbia and Montenegro; Serbia	2007	6	0
Total		47	0

== Managerial statistics ==
As of 28 April 2024

Managerial record by team and tenure
Team	Nat	From	To	Record				
Team	Nat	From	To	G	W	D	L	Win %
Teleoptik	(Serbia)	6 June 2022	28 February 2023	15	7	4	4	46.67
Partizan	(Serbia)	28 February 2023	28 April 2024	54	30	9	15	55.56
Career totals				69	37	13	19	53.62

== Honours ==
Partizan

- First League of FR Yugoslavia: 1998–99, 2001–02, 2002–03
- FR Yugoslavia Cup: 1997–98, 2000–01

Shakhtar Donetsk

- Ukrainian Premier League: 2004–05, 2005–06, 2007–08, 2009–10
- Ukrainian Cup: 2003–04, 2007–08
- Ukrainian Super Cup: 2005, 2008
- UEFA Cup: 2008–09

Sevastopol

- Ukrainian First League: 2012–13

Individual

- Partizan Player of the Year: 2003
