= Nebojša Dugalić =

Serbian actor and theater director (born 1970)

- Небојша Дугалић
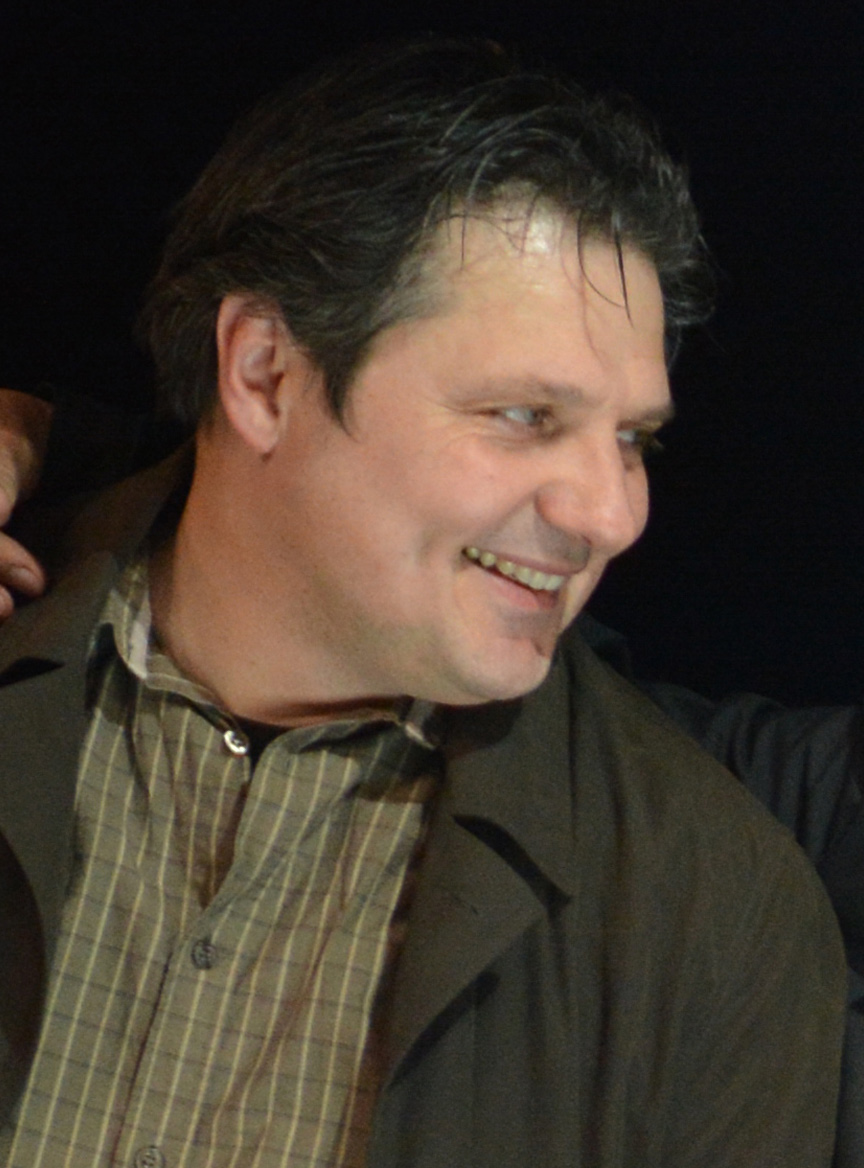
- Born: 17 May 1970 (age 55); Kraljevo, SR Serbia, SFR Yugoslavia
- Education: Faculty of Dramatic Arts
- Alma mater: University of Arts in Belgrade
- Occupations: Actor, theater director, professor
- Years active: 1992–present
- Spouse: Dragana Dugalić
- Children: five

Nebojša Dugalić (Serbian Cyrillic: Небојша Дугалић; pronounced [něboːjʃa dǔgalit͡ɕ], born 17 May 1970) is a Serbian actor, theater director and drama professor.

== Career ==
Dugalić completed his elementary and high school education in his hometown Kraljevo, and graduated from the Faculty of Dramatic Arts of the University of Arts in Belgrade in 1994.

=== Acting ===
Dugalić's home theater was the National Theater in Belgrade, but in 2000 he left the professional position there to pursue a teaching career. He also acted in a number of plays in other Belgrade theaters, including Madlenianum, Terazije Theater and Yugoslav Drama Theater. During his career, he received a number of awards, including:

- Cesare in "Mask" by Miloš Crnjanski – Annual Award of the National Theater
- Sigismund in Life is a Dream by Pedro Calderón de la Barca – Annual Award of the National Theater, award "Milivoje Živanović" in Požarevac
- Petar in Govorna mana by Goran Marković – Sterija Award, award "Ljubiša Jovanović" in Šabac, critics' award for best acting achievement in 1998–99 season
- Karađoz in The Damned Yard by Ivo Andrić – Sterija Award, "Zoran Radmilović" award, audience award on Sterijino Pozorje, award "Milivoje Živanović"
- four "Golden Knights" and two "Silver Knight" on the "Golden Knight" International Theater Festival in Russia
- award for directing Putujuće pozorište Šopalović, Šabac
- audience award for directing Omer paša Latas, Brčko
- Robert in Betrayal by Harold Pinter – 2014 "Miloš Žutić" award by the Union of Drama Artists of Serbia

In 2010, he directed and played in the monodrama Confession of Dmitry Karamazov, based on Dostoyevsky's The Brothers Karamazov, for which he received the Silver Knight in Moscow and opened the first Festival of Monodrama and Pantomime in Zemun.

In 2025, he played in Milorad Milinković's posthumous film Pearlescent Fog.

=== Teaching ===
Dugalić has a long teaching career with the Academy of Arts, Belgrade, a private university specialized in drama arts. He became an assistant professor in 2001, and full professor in 2007. He was the dean on the same Academy for the school year 2015-2016. He helped establish the "Integration Workshop", a Belgrade theater for blind and visually impaired actors.

== Personal life ==
Dugalić lives with his wife Dragana in Belgrade. They have five children, three sons and two daughters.
