= Pearlescent Fog =

- Theatrical release poster
- Directed by: Milorad Milinković
- Screenplay by: Milorad Milinković; Dragoljub Stojkovic
- Based on: Pearlescent Fog by Dragoljub Stojkovic
- Produced by: Milorad Milinković; Dragoljub Stojkovic
- Starring: Miloš Timotijević; Petar Strugar; Jana Ivanović; Nebojša Dugalić; Vojislav Brajović; Luka Grbić; Miona Marković; Jelena Ilić; Mariana Arandjelović
- Cinematography: Dalibor Tonkovic
- Edited by: Stevan Maric
- Music by: Ana Krstajic
- Production company: Telekom Srbija
- Release date: July 19, 2025 (Palić)
- Running time: 140 minutes
- Country: Serbia
- Language: Serbian

Pearlescent Fog (Serbian: Седеф-магла), also known as Pearl Mist, is a 2025 Serbian historical crime drama film co-written, co-produced and directed by Milorad Milinković. It is based on the novel of the same name by Dragoljub Stojkovic. The cast is composed of Miloš Timotijević, Petar Strugar, Jana Ivanović, Nebojša Dugalić, Vojislav Brajović, Luka Grbić, Miona Marković, Jelena Ilić and Mariana Arandjelović.

== Synopsis ==
In 1882, Jelena Ilka Marković was found dead in her cell, serving her sentence after attempting to assassinate King Milan Obrenović in the cathedral. It is believed she committed suicide, but evidence indicates otherwise. Years later, a failed lawyer and the Belgrade police chief reopen the case when the body of a woman killed by the police and that of Prince Miloš's great-grandson are found.

== Cast ==
- Miloš Timotijević as Djordje Coguric
- Petar Strugar as Andrija Kusturic
- Jana Ivanović as Katarina Konstantinović Blaznavac
- Nebojša Dugalić as Milivoje Petrovic Blaznavac
- Vojislav Brajović as Atanas Jovanovic
- Luka Grbić as Marko Košarić
- Miona Marković
- Jelena Ilić
- Mariana Arandjelović
- Maja Čampar as Milicia
- Milica Janković

== Release ==
The film had its world premiere on July 19, 2025, at the 32nd Palić European Film Festival, then screened on August 19, 2025, at the 8th Danube Film Fest.
