= The Samurai in Autumn =

- Directed by: Danilo Bećković
- Starring: Petar Strugar; Hristina Popović
- Release date: 1 October 2016
- Running time: 117 minutes
- Country: Serbia
- Language: Serbian

The Samurai in Autumn (Serbian: Jesen samuraja) is a 2016 Serbian comedy film directed by Danilo Bećković.

== Cast ==
- Petar Strugar - Vladica
- Hristina Popović - Snezana
- Nikola Kojo - Miloje
- Sergej Trifunović -
- Andrija Milošević - Janko
- Petar Novićević - Vukasin
- Miodrag Krstović - Delegat
- Katarina Žutić - Rada
