= Morbidi i mnoći =

Yugoslavian alternative goth rock band

- Origin: Belgrade, Yugoslavia (now Serbia)
- Genres: Goth rock; Alternative rock
- Years active: 1984–1990
- Past members: Milorad Milinković; Mario Surjan; Sterije Tolić; Marko Milivojević; Nebojša Čurčić; Dejan Stefanović; Mario Šeparović

Morbidi i mnoći was a Yugoslavian alternative goth rock band active from around 1984 to 1990. Founded by Milorad Milinković "Debeli" and Mario Surjan in Belgrade, the band went through several lineups during their active years during the Yugoslav new wave scene. Besides them, the band consisted of Sterije Tolić, Marko Milivojević, Nebojša Čurčić, Dejan Stefanović, and Mario Šeparović.

== History ==
The band was formed in 1984/1985 in Belgrade, Yugoslavia. The name consists of three words: "morbidi" (morbose), "i" (and), and a mixture of the words "moći" (might) and "noći" (night). Lead guitarist Mario Surjan previously played in the Belgrade-based punk band Krvna zrnca, as well as with Toni Montano's band Radost Evrope with drummer Dragoslav Draža Radojković (later of the band Laibach), and Dime Todorov "Mune" of the Partibrejkers. Surjan was friends with Milinković when both of them began working on experimental music. After losing a tape to Ralph Records, they decided to form an "alternative pop band".

The band's first hit was on the live radio show Ventilator 202 with the song "Igraj tvist na njenom licu". From 1985 to 1988 the band recorded and produced their songs in two studios; the newly founded studio by U škripcu, financed by Milinković, and the "Branko Hendrix" studio in Belgrade, owned by Branko "Hendrix" Potkonjak. Due to financial reasons, most of their songs were recorded in one take. During this time Marko Milivojević, who later would play for Ekatarina Velika as well as the Partibrejkers, was replaced as the drummer after the death of Sterije Tolić. Danko Gajić, a friend of Milinković, was brought in as another guitarist. In 1985, bassist Dejan Stefanović, who previously played keyboards for Duh Nibor, quit the band. The band actively performed live. Their most popular online song is "Put" (1987).

The band never signed any record deals, and so never released an album. The band was rejected by Serbian record label PGP-RTB for being "propagators of drug addiction". Consequently, all of their songs were remastered from demo and low quality tracks and uploaded to YouTube many years later, where they garnered popularity with over a million views. In 2022, Mario Surjan re-released the band's old songs under an official name on Spotify, Apple Music, Amazon Music, and Google Music, after which he started a solo career.

== Discography ==
- The Second Resurrection (2023)

== See also ==
- Music of Yugoslavia
- List of Serbian musicians
