= Little Buddho =

Little Budo
- Film poster
- Directed by: Danilo Bećković
- Starring: Petar Strugar; Sergej Trifunović
- Release date: 22 January 2014
- Running time: 96 minutes
- Country: Serbia
- Language: Serbian

Little Budo (Serbian: Mali Budo) is a 2014 Serbian comedy film directed by Danilo Bećković.

== Cast ==
- Petar Strugar - Budo
- Sergej Trifunović - Mišo
- Tihomir Stanić - Krsto
- Petar Božović - Božo
- Slobodan Ćustić - Drago
- Aleksandra Janković - Mala Sandra
- Jelena Rakočević - Stela
- Milorad Kapor - Pero
- Stefan Bundalo - Brajan
- Tanasije Uzunović - Vuksan
- Slaviša Čurović - Mirko
- Marko Baćović - Doktor Perović
- Tomo Kuruzović - Blažo
- Hristina Popović - Zorica
- Uroš Jovčić - Bajo
