= Požarevac City Stadium =

Sports venue in Požarevac, Serbia

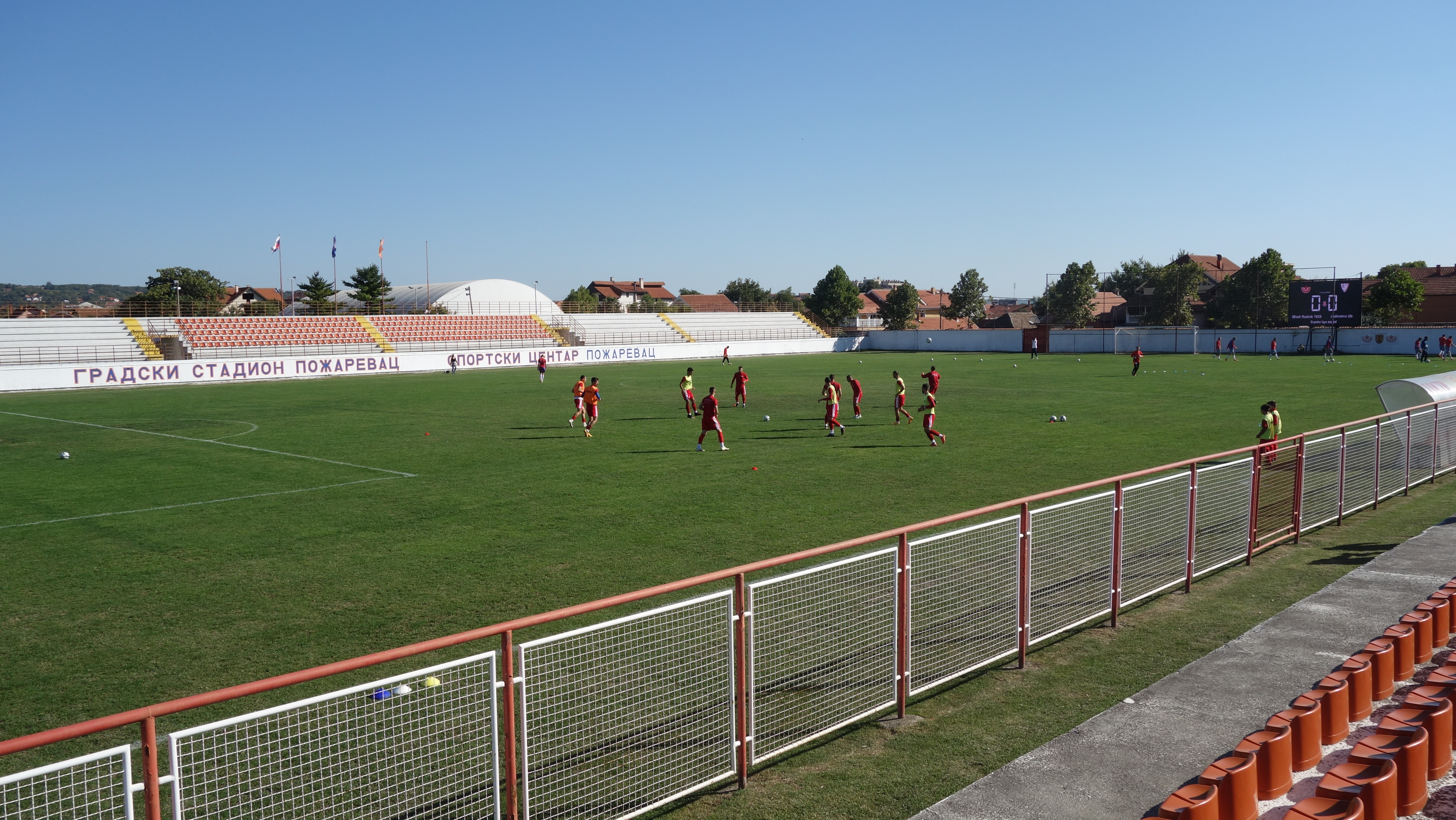
- Požarevac City Stadium pictured in 2021
- Interactive map of Požarevac City Stadium
- Location: Požarevac, Serbia
- Coordinates: 44.6181°N 21.1722°E
- Owner: City of Požarevac
- Capacity: 3,500
- Surface: Grass

Construction
- Opened: 1935; 91 years ago
- Renovated: 2009

Tenants
- FK Mladi Radnik (1935—present); ŽFK Požarevac (1995—present)

Požarevac City Stadium (Serbian: Градски стадион у Пожаревцу / Gradski stadion u Požarevcu), also nicknamed Vašarište, is a multi-purpose stadium in Požarevac, Serbia. It is mainly used for football matches and hosts the home ground of FK Mladi Radnik of the Serbian League West. The stadium has a total capacity of 3,500.

== History ==
The stadium was built in 1935 and is part of the Požarevac Sports Centre grounds.

For decades, the stadium had only one stand with a roof that stretched across a few rows in the central area. After Mladi Radnik gained promotion to the Serbian SuperLiga in 2009, the stadium was renovated prior to the 2009–10 season. A new stand was made and seating was installed in both areas, which expanded the capacity to 3,500.

On 9 August 2022, the stadium was renamed in honour of Mihajlo Andrejević.
