= Aleksandar Filimonović =

American actor

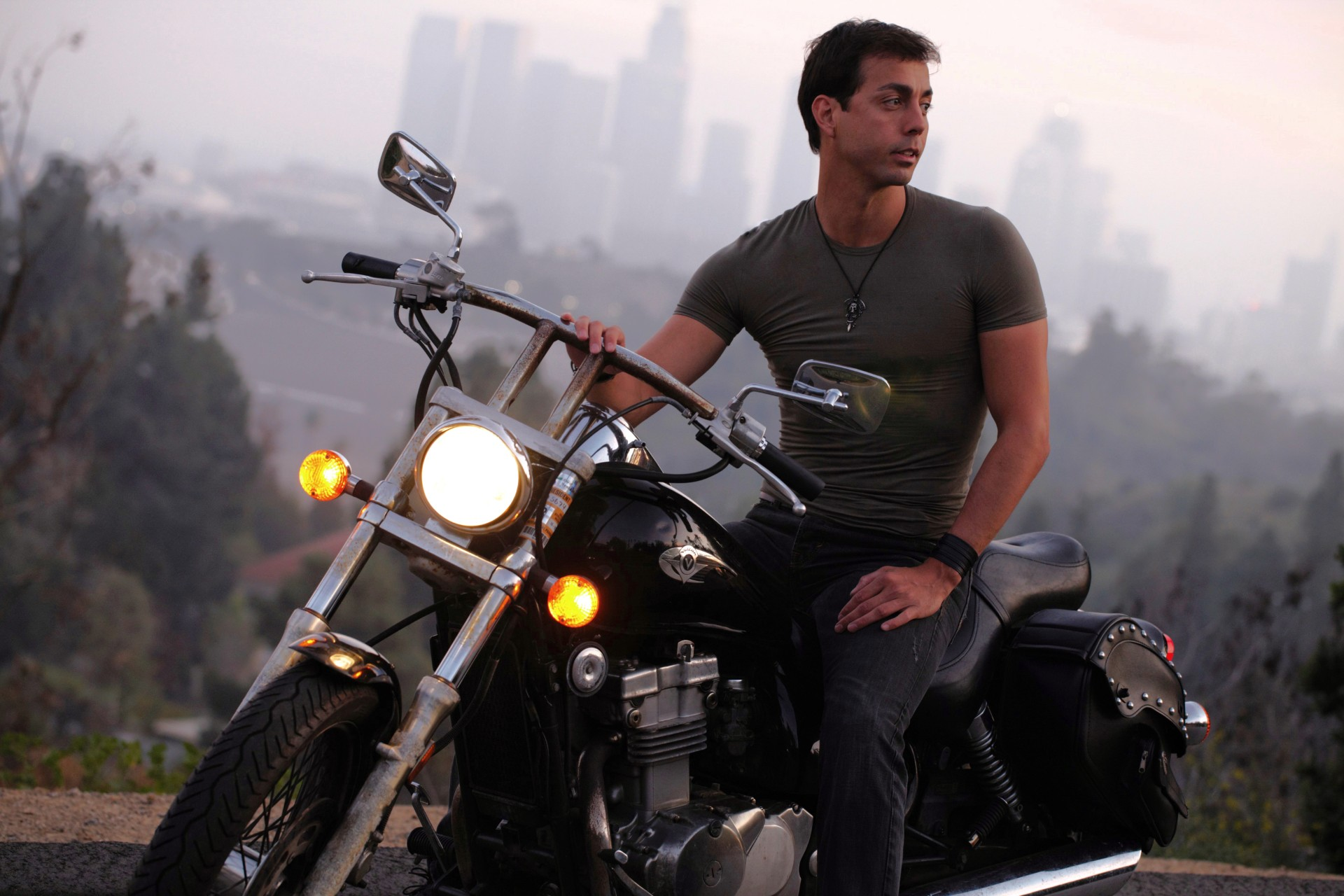
- Born: (Socialist Federal Republic of Yugoslavia) Belgrade, Yugoslavia
- Years active: 2009–present
- Website: Filimonovic.com

Aleksandar Filimonović is a Serbian-American film and television actor, writer and producer best known for his roles in the films Dolemite Is My Name, White Lions and Montevideo, and in the television series Gaslit, S.W.A.T., The Americans, NCIS, My father's killers, Ravna gora, Village is burning..., and others.

== Personal life ==
Aleksandar has lived in Belgrade, Moscow, London, New York and Los Angeles, and is fluent in English, Russian and Serbian. Before attending Lee Strasberg Theatre and Film Institute he attained a BSc in Computer Science from Royal Holloway, University of London and has graduated from IV Belgrade Gymnasium before that. He is also a member of MENSA high-iq society.

Other than acting, Aleksandar has been involved in many different sports, including soccer (at FK Rad youth team and later University of London All-star team), he also had a STARS (Student Talented Athlete Recognition Scheme) scholarship at Royal Holloway; He practices Shotokan Karate, in which he trained with Masataka Mori and James Field, he holds a black-belt; aikido, in which he trained with Mirko Jovandić and Yoshimitsu Yamada; XMA (eXtreme Martial Arts), with Mike Chat; and quite a few other sports, including snowboarding, waterskiing, ice-skating, horseback riding, sky-diving, volleyball, tennis, speedboat, jetski, motorcycle and car racing.

He also plays guitar, piano and sings - he is a bass-baritone. Aleksandar also studied Latin and ballroom dancing with Paul Pellicoro.

Known for his humanitarian attitude, Aleksandar is a member of the Red Cross, where he is a lifeguard and was involved in multiple rescue operations during the catastrophic 2014 Balkan floods. He has also saved a lady's life on an intercontinental flight in the spring of 2018.

== Acting education ==
Before moving to New York to attend the Lee Strasberg Theatre and Film Institute, Aleksandar was a member of Mika Aleksić's acting studio (Thing of the Heart) in Belgrade. At Lee Strasberg he studied under many renowned acting teachers, including Hope Arthur, George Loros, Paul Calderón, Robert Ellerman, Anna Strasberg, Irma Sandrey, Geoffrey Horne, Ted Zurkowski, Pennie DuPont, Jeffrey Ferguson, Bruce Baumer, Jan Douglas, Chris Lutkin, Michael Ryan, Kohli Calhoun, John van Wyden, Allen Suddeth, Robert Castle and Richard Larson.

== Filmography ==
=== Film ===
Year	Title	Role	Notes
2010	Montevideo, God Bless You!	Ljubiša Stevanović "Leo"	
2011	White Lions	Dzoksi	
2014	Beyond the mirror	Death	Short film
2016	Occam's razor	Aleksei Petrov	Short film
2019	Dolemite Is My Name	Joseph Bihari	
2025	Guardian of the icon of St. George	Sladjan Reljic	

=== Television ===
Year	Title	Role	Notes
2009	1000 Ways to Die	Mikhail	Episode: 'Up with Death"
2010–2011	Village is burning...	Adam	7 episodes
2012	Blossom of linden in the Balkans	Timoti	Episode #1.12
2012	Montevideo, God bless you!	Ljubiša Stevanović "Leo"	3 episodes
2013	Roommates	Nikola	Episode #1.1
2013–2014	Ravna gora	Krcun	5 episodes
2014	Gli anni spezzati	Prospero Gallinari	2 episodes
2016–2017	My father's killers	Dejan Mitrovic	6 episodes
2017	NCIS	Armed bodyguard	Episode: "Pandora's Box, Part I"
2017	The Americans	Yugoslav guard	Episode: "What's the Matter with Kansas?"
2018	Code Despot	Johnny	3 episodes
2021	Dream Team	Seki	14 episodes
2021	S.W.A.T.	Gorov	Episode: "Keep the Faith"
2022	Gaslit	Zolton	5 episodes
2025	The Flighters	Prota	38 episodes
2025	Crown Street 11	Simon	2 episodes
