= Hristina Popović =

Serbian actress

- Христина Поповић
- Born: 26 March 1982 (age 44); Belgrade, SR Serbia, SFR Yugoslavia
- Occupation: Actress
- Years active: 1991–present

Hristina Popović (Serbian Cyrillic: Христина Поповић; born 26 March 1982) is a Serbian actress. She appeared in more than thirty films since 1991.

== Selected filmography ==
Year	Title	Role	Notes
2011	The Parade	Biserka	
2013	Circles	Nada	
2013	The Brave Adventures of a Little Shoemaker	Mistress	
2014	Little Buddho	Zorica	
2015	Next to Me	Olja	
2015	Enclave	Belgrade teacher	
2016	The Samurai in Autumn	Snežana	
2016	A Good Wife	Nataša	
