= Miodrag Krstović =

Serbian actor

- Born: May 10, 1950 (age 76); Belgrade, Yugoslavia
- Other names: Miki; Miodrag Krstović; Miodrag-Miki Krstović
- Occupation: Actor
- Years active: 1976-present

Miodrag "Miki" Krstović (born 10 May 1950) is a Serbian actor. He appeared in more than one hundred films since 1976.

== Selected filmography ==
Year	Title	Role	Notes
2016	The Samurai in Autumn	Delegat	(credited as Miodrag Krstović)
2014	Killer Mermaid	Guardian	(credited as Miodrag Krstović)
2014	In Order of Disappearance	Dragomir Bogdanović	(credited as Miodrag Krstović)
2012	Doktor Rej i đavoli	Drug Branko	(credited as Miodrag Krstović)
2009	Zone of the Dead	Inspector Dragan	(credited as Miodrag Krstović)
2007	The Fourth Man	Doktor	(credited as Miodrag Krstović)
2003	The Professional	Jovan	(credited as Miodrag-Miki Krstović)
2002	T.T. Syndrome	Specijalni gost	(credited as Miodrag Krstović)

1976 Vrhovi Zelengore (Partizan)
