= Petar Strugar =

Montenegrin actor and presenter

- Петар Стругар
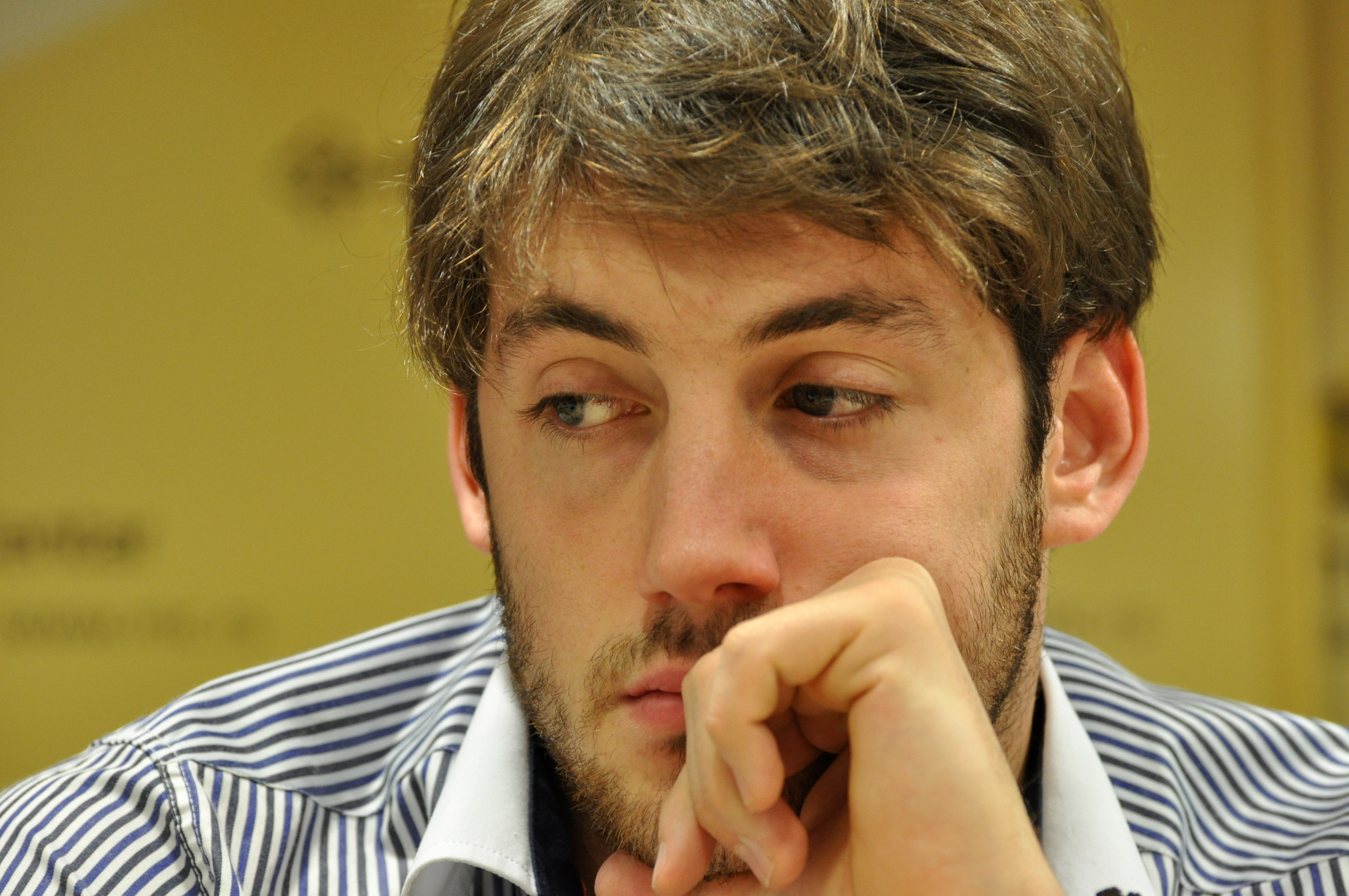
- Born: Petar Strugar; 23 May 1988 (age 38); Cetinje, SR Montenegro, Yugoslavia
- Years active: 2010–present
- Spouse: Ivana Nikolić (m. 2013; div. 2015)
- Partner(s): Milica Todorović (2018–2020); Olja (2021–present)
- Children: 2

Petar "Pero" Strugar (Serbian: Петар "Перо" Стругар; born 23 May 1988) is a Montenegrin and Serbian actor and presenter.

== Personal life ==
Strugar is a close friend to fellow actor and Montevideo, God Bless You! co-star Miloš Biković.

Strugar was married to actress Ivana Nikolic from 2013 to 2015 and have one son together. Later he was in relationship with Serbian singer Milica Todorović. He also has a child with a woman named Olja.

== Filmography ==
Film
Title	Year	Role	Notes
2010	Montevideo, God Bless You!	Blagoje "Moša" Marjanović	
2014	Little Buddho	Budo	
2014	See You in Montevideo	Blagoje "Moša" Marjanović	
2016	The Samurai in Autumn	Vladica	
2025	Pearlescent Fog	Andrija Kusturic	

TV
Title	Year	Role	Notes
2012	Budva na pjenu od mora	Mirovic	Guest star (1 episode)
2012–2014	Montevideo, God Bless You!	Blagoje "Moša" Marjanović	Main cast (27 episodes)
2013	Tvoje lice zvuči poznato (Serbian season 1)	Himself	Presenter (13 episodes)
2013	Zene s Dedinja	Gynecologist	Guest star (1 episode)
2016	Nemoj da zvocaš!	Milo Golubovic	Recurring (13 episodes)
2016	Andrija i Anđelka	Himself	Guest star (2 episodes)
2016–2017	Prava žena	Davor Matić	Main cast (50 episodes)
2018	Pet	Boxer	

=== Serbian dubs ===
Film
Title	Year	Role	Work
2010	How to Train Your Dragon	Snotlout	Voice acting
2010	Beauty and the Beast	Baker	Voice acting
2011	Rango	Spoons	Voice acting
2013	Cloudy with a Chance of Meatballs 2	Chester V	Voice acting
2014	How to Train Your Dragon 2	Snotlout	Voice acting
2014	Big Hero 6	Tadashi Hamada	Voice acting
2015	Inside Out	Imaginary Boyfriends	Voice acting
2016	The Angry Birds Movie	Red	Voice acting
2016	Kung Fu Panda 3	Panda Big Fun	Voice acting
2019	How to Train Your Dragon: The Hidden World	Snotlout	Voice acting
2019	Spies in Disguise	N/A	Directing
2019	The Angry Birds Movie 2	Red	Voice acting

TV
Title	Year	Role	Work
2002–2007	Naruto	Shikamaru Nara, Hashirama Senju	Voice acting
2007–2017	Naruto Shippuden	Shikamaru Nara, Minato Namikaze, Hashirama Senju	Voice acting
2015–2016	Seraph of the End	Yuichiro Hyakuya	Voice acting
2016–present	Bungo Stray Dogs	Ryūnosuke Akutagawa	Voice acting
2016–2018	Skylanders Academy	Pop Fizz, Skull, Captain Flynn	Voice acting
2017–present	Boruto: Naruto Next Generations	Shikamaru Nara	Voice acting
2018–present	That Time I Got Reincarnated as a Slime	Diablo	Voice acting
2020–present	Helluva Boss	Blitzo Buckzo	Voice acting
2025–present	A Wild Last Boss Appeared!	Lufas Maphaahl (Lufas' Male Human Avatar / "I"), Castor	Voice acting

Video Game
Title	Year	Role	Work
1998	Grim Fandango	Manuel "Manny" Calavera	Voice acting
2004	Grand Theft Auto: San Andreas	Carl "CJ" Johnson	Voice acting
2005	Psychonauts	Razputin "Raz" Aquato	Voice acting
2008	Grand Theft Auto IV	Niko Bellic, Luis Fernando Lopez	Voice acting
2009	Grand Theft Auto IV: The Lost and Damned	Niko Bellic, Luis Fernando Lopez	Voice acting
2009	Brütal Legend	Lars Halford	Voice acting
2009	Grand Theft Auto: The Ballad of Gay Tony	Luis Fernando Lopez, Niko Bellic	Voice acting
2010	Epic Mickey	Oswald the Lucky Rabbit	Voice acting
2011	L.A. Noire	Cole Phelps, Jack Kelso	Voice acting
2011	Skylanders: Spyro's Adventure	Captain Flynn	Voice acting
2012	Persona 4 Golden	Yu Narukami	Voice acting
2012	Darksiders II	Death	Voice acting
2012	Skylanders: Giants	Pop Fizz, Captain Flynn	Voice acting
2012	Epic Mickey 2: The Power of Two	Oswald the Lucky Rabbit	Voice acting
2013	Grand Theft Auto V	Franklin Clinton	Voice acting
2013	Skylanders: Swap Force	Pop Fizz, Captain Flynn	Voice acting
2014	Broken Age	Husker Beastender Tartine	Voice acting
2014	Skylanders: Trap Team	Pop Fizz, Captain Flynn	Voice acting
2015	Skylanders: SuperChargers	Pop Fizz, Spitfire, Captain Flynn	Voice acting
2016	Skylanders: Imaginators	Pop Fizz, Captain Flynn	Voice acting
2017	Horizon Zero Dawn	Erend Vanguardsman	Voice acting
2018	Marvel's Spider-Man	Miles Morales	Voice acting
2019	Darksiders III	Death	Voice acting
2020	Crash Bandicoot 4: It's About Time	Lani-Loni	Voice acting
2020	Marvel's Spider-Man: Miles Morales	Miles Morales / Spider-Man	Voice acting
2021	Shin Megami Tensei III: Nocturne HD Remaster	Lucifer, Louis Cypher (Lucifer's Human/Old Gentleman form)	Voice acting
2021	Psychonauts 2	Razputin "Raz" Aquato	Voice acting
2021	Shin Megami Tensei V	Susanoo, Aogami (Susanoo's Demon Fiend form), Lucifer	Voice acting
2022	Horizon Forbidden West	Erend Vanguardsman	Voice acting
2023	Marvel's Spider-Man 2	Miles Morales / Spider-Man	Voice acting
2024	Metaphor: ReFantazio	Leon Strohl da Haliaetus	Voice acting
