= Danina Jeftić =

Australian handball player

- Born: 9 November 1986 (age 39); Sarajevo, SR Bosnia and Herzegovina, SFR Yugoslavia
- Occupations: Actress, former handball player
- Years active: 2008–present

Danina Jeftić (Serbian Cyrillic: Данина Јефтић; born 9 November 1986) is a Bosnian-born Serbian actress and former handball player. She came to national media attention with 2010 film Montevideo, God Bless You! by actor and film director Dragan Bjelogrlić.

== Early and personal life ==
Danina Jeftić was born on 9 November 1986 in Sarajevo (SFR Yugoslavia then, Bosnia and Herzegovina now). She has a younger sister, Kristina. When the war broke out in Bosnia in 1991, her family moved to Moscow (USSR then, Russia now), and then to Sydney, Australia. There, she began playing handball, basketball, and tennis. Jeftić is fluent in Serbian, English and Russian.

Jeftić and her family moved to Belgrade in 2005, and they reside in Jajinci, a suburb of Belgrade. Jeftić stated that she had a boyfriend.

== Career ==
Jeftić played handball for Australian junior female team, but gave up her handball career for acting. Upon moving to Belgrade, she enrolled in the University of Dramatic Arts. In 2008, Jeftić landed one of the few leading roles in the RTV Pink series Money or Life (Pare ili život). In 2010, actor and director Dragan Bjelogrlić cast her in his film Montevideo, God Bless You! (Montevideo, Bog te video!). The film made Jeftić a household name. She was nominated for FIPRESCI Serbia Award and MTV Adria Movie Award for Best Actress for her performance.

== Filmography ==
Title	Year	Role	Notes
Money or Life	2008	Maja	(TV; 2008–10) Pare ili život
Montevideo, God Bless You! Part 1	2010	Rosa	Montevideo, Bog te video! Priča prva Nominated—FIPRESCI Serbia Award for Best Actress; Nominated—MTV Adria Movie Award for Best Actress
Budva na pjeni od mora	2012–2013	Hana	
On the Way to Montevideo	2011	Rosa	
Pobednik	2016		
Igra Sudbine	2020–present	Klaudija	
Dodji juče	2021	Kata	
Kamijondžije	2021	Đerasima	
Klan	2021	Udovica	
