= Mihajlo Andrejević =

Serbian footballer

Personal information
- Full name: Mihajlo Andrejević
- Date of birth: 3 July 1898
- Place of birth: Požarevac, Kingdom of Serbia
- Date of death: 20 September 1989 (aged 91)
- Place of death: Belgrade, SR Serbia, SFR Yugoslavia

Mihajlo Andrejević (Serbian Cyrillic: Михајло Андрејевић; 3 July 1898 – 20 September 1989) was a Serbian doctor, footballer and sports administrator.

== Playing career ==
Nicknamed Andrejka, the beginning of his career was parallel to the beginnings of BSK. As an exceptionally gifted player already in 1914, he played for the first team. At the beginning of the First World War, he volunteered as a soldier of the Royal Serbian Army. He was captured and taken to Bulgaria. There he continued to play football, featuring for Levski and FK13. He escaped from captivity and in 1918 participated in the breakthrough of the Salonica front. After his release, he played a few more games for BSK, and then played for the reserves of Vienna's Wiener Sport-Club.

== Post-playing career ==
After finishing his career, he immediately joined the management of BSK. After the Football Association of Yugoslavia moved from Zagreb to Belgrade in 1930, he was elected secretary for foreign affairs. He had great merit for the national team going to the 1930 FIFA World Cup. He was elected president of the association in 1939. He was elected a member of the FIFA Supervisory Board in 1932, and already in 1936 he became a member of the Executive Committee. He was the president of FIFA's Arbitration and Medical Commission. He remained a member of FIFA on and off until 1982, when he was elected a lifetime honorary member. In 1984, he was among the seven meritorious football workers, the first awarded with the FIFA Order of Merit, and he also received the Gold Award from the International Olympic Committee.

Andrejević became a doctor of medicine while still a football player. He was a professor at the Belgrade Faculty of Medicine in the period 1953–1969. Until the end of his life, he wrote interesting and above all useful articles in the field of medicine in Nedeljna Borba. Until his death, he held the position of president of the Association of Warriors of Serbia 1914–1918. He wrote a memoir entitled Dugo putovanje kroz fudbal i medicinu (A long journey through football and medicine).

According to his son, Andrejević injected chocolate into the veins of Yugoslav footballers at halftime of a deciding 1974 FIFA World Cup qualifier where Josip Katalinski scored the winning goal which sent Yugoslavia to the World Cup.

=== Legacy ===
In 1977, he was awarded the Bronze Olympic Order, the highest award of the International Olympic Committee. Andrejević is portrayed by Vojin Ćetković in the 2010 Serbian sports drama Montevideo: Taste of a Dream and in the 2014 sequel See You in Montevideo. On 9 August 2022, the Požarevac City Stadium was renamed in his honour.
