= Milorad Milinković =

Serbian film director and screenwriter (1965–2025)

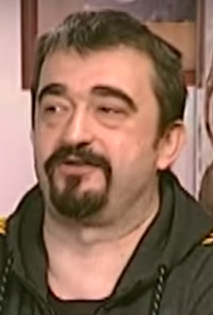
Milorad Milinković

Milorad Milinković (18 March 1965 – 6 January 2025) was a Serbian film director and screenwriter.

== Biography ==
He is best known for his film Frozen Stiff (2002) and for directing the first Serbian 3D film, Fifth Butterfly (2014). He was also one of the Chasers in the Serbian version of the game show The Chase. From 1984 to 1990 he was the vocalist and rhythm guitarist of the goth rock band Morbidi i Mnoći.

He died from lung disease on 6 January 2025, at the age of 59. On July 19, 2025, Pearlescent Fog released posthumously at the 32nd Palić European Film Festival.
