= Palić European Film Festival =

Palić European Film Festival is a European film festival that takes place in the town of Palić (a lake resort near Subotica, north Serbia). As of 2019, it has been held 26 times.

The Festival includes nine programs: Official Selection, Young Spirit of Europe; Parallels and Encounters Programme, Hommage programme, Country in Focus, New Hungarian film, Eco Dox, Children's programme and Underground Spirit.

== See also ==
- Serbian culture
