= Momčilo Đokić =

Serbian footballer

Personal information
- Date of birth: 27 February 1911
- Place of birth: Smederevo, Kingdom of Serbia
- Date of death: 21 April 1983 (aged 72)
- Place of death: Bela Crkva, SFR Yugoslavia
- Position: Midfielder

Senior career*
Years	Team	Apps	(Gls)
1930–1939	SK Jugoslavija	70	(2)

International career
1930–1936	Yugoslavia	13	(0)

Managerial career
- Radnički Niš
- Bor
- Timok
- * Club domestic league appearances and goals

Momčilo Đokić (Serbian Cyrillic: Момчило Ђокић; 27 February 1911 – 21 April 1983) was a Serbian football player and manager.

== Career ==
Known as Gusar, Đokić is remembered as one of the best wingers in the Yugoslav First League between the two world wars.

He started playing in the youth team of Soko In 1921 he joined SK Jugoslavija where he will play for the rest of his career. He started playing for the senior team in 1928, and would play, mostly as left-winger, all the way until 1940.

He played a total of 13 matches for the Yugoslavia national football team. His debut was on 13 April 1930 against Bulgaria, in Belgrade, a 6–1 win, and his fairway match was on 13 December 1936, in Paris against France, a 1–0 loss. He played all the matches at the 1930 FIFA World Cup in Uruguay.

After retiring, he graduated in Business, and worked in several places in the former Yugoslavia, mostly in Serbia, where in some he simultaneously worked as a coach in clubs like FK Radnički Niš, FK Bor and FK Timok.
