= Dragoslav Mihajlović =

Yugoslav footballer

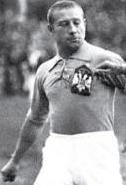
- Mihajlović with Kingdom of Yugoslavia in 1930

Personal information
- Date of birth: 13 December 1906
- Place of birth: Aleksinac, Kingdom of Serbia
- Date of death: 18 June 1978 (aged 71)
- Place of death: Sale, Australia
- Position: Defender

Senior career*
Years	Team	Apps	(Gls)
1924–1931	BSK Beograd		
1936–1940	Jedinstvo Beograd		

International career
1930	Kingdom of Yugoslavia	4	(0)
- * Club domestic league appearances and goals

Dragoslav Mihajlović (13 December 1906 – 18 June 1978) was a Yugoslav footballer.

== International career ==
On the national level, Mihajlović made his debut for Yugoslavia in a June 1930 friendly match away against Bulgaria and earned a total of 4 caps (no goals). He also was a participant at the 1930 FIFA World Cup.

In 1944 he emigrated to Sale, Australia.
