= Ljubiša Stevanović =

Serbian footballer (1910–1978)

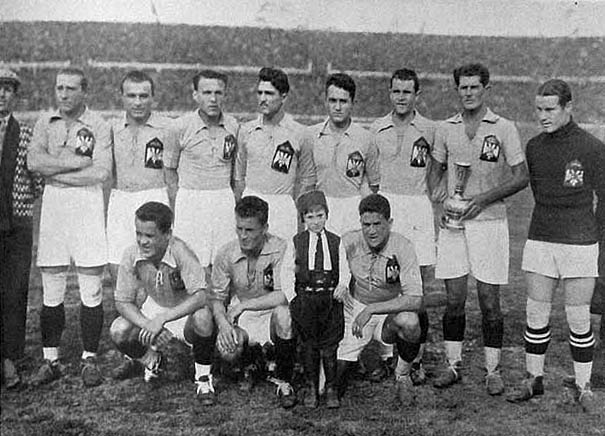
- The Yugoslavia national football team during the first FIFA World Cup held in Uruguay. Stevanović is in back row second left.

Personal information
- Date of birth: 4 January 1910
- Place of birth: Belgrade, Kingdom of Serbia
- Date of death: 17 May 1978 (aged 68)
- Place of death: Nice, France
- Position: Defender

Senior career*
Years	Team	Apps	(Gls)
1926	Vardar Beograd		
1927	Jedinstvo Beograd		
1928	BSK Beograd		
1929–1931	Sète	27	(0)
1931–1933	Nîmes		
1933–1937	Saint-Étienne	61	(0)
1937–1938	Toulouse		
1938	Olympique Avignonnais		
1939–1940	Toulouse		

International career
1930	Kingdom of Yugoslavia	4	(0)

Managerial career
- 1943–1946: Sète
- * Club domestic league appearances and goals

Ljubiša "Leo" Stevanović (Serbian Cyrillic: Љубиша Стевановић; 4 January 1910 – 17 May 1978) was a Serbian footballer who represented Yugoslavia (4 caps, 0 goals).
