= 2026–27 Campeonato de Portugal =

14th season of the Campeonato de Portugal football league

Campeonato de Portugal
- Season: 2026–27

The 2026–27 Campeonato de Portugal is the fourteenth season of Portuguese football's fourth-tier league since the merging of the Segunda Divisão and Terceira Divisão in 2013, and the eleventh season under the current Campeonato de Portugal title. Following the creation of Liga 3, the new third-tier league in 2021, this is the sixth season of the Campeonato de Portugal as the fourth tier of the Portuguese football league system, the 29th overall at that level.

The competition is scheduled to be contested by 56 clubs: four clubs relegated from the 2025–26 Liga 3, 32 clubs that retained their places in the 2025–26 Campeonato de Portugal, and 20 clubs indicated by the district and regional championships. The clubs are divided into four geographically based series.

== Group stage ==
=== Serie A ===
Pos	Team	Pld	W	D	L	GF	GA	GD	Pts	Qualification or relegation
1	Limianos	8	5	3	0	18	11	+7	18	Qualification for the Promotion play-offs
2	Braga B	8	4	4	0	15	8	+7	16	Qualification for the Promotion play-offs
3	Bragança	8	5	1	2	10	6	+4	16	
4	Tirsense	8	5	0	3	15	11	+4	15	
5	Chaves B	8	4	0	4	9	7	+2	12	
6	Montalegre	8	3	3	2	10	6	+4	12	
7	Celoricense	8	3	3	2	9	7	+2	12	
8	Maia	8	3	2	3	10	9	+1	11	
9	Rebordosa	8	2	4	2	11	4	+7	10	
10	Ponte da Barca	8	3	1	4	8	12	−4	10	
11	Vila Meã	8	2	3	3	10	9	+1	9	Qualification for the Relegation play-offs
12	Brito	8	2	1	5	10	18	−8	7	Qualification for the Relegation play-offs
13	Maria da Fonte	8	2	1	5	7	13	−6	7	Relegation to the District Championship
14	Vinhais	8	0	0	8	5	26	−21	0	Relegation to the District Championship

Updated to match(es) played on 8 November 2026. Source: FPF.pt
Rules for classification: 1) Points, 2) Head-to-head points, 3) Head-to-head goal difference, 4) Goal difference, 5) Matches won, 6) Goals scored

=== Serie B ===
Pos	Team	Pld	W	D	L	GF	GA	GD	Pts	Qualification or relegation
1	Ovarense	8	7	1	0	17	4	+13	22	Qualification for the Promotion play-offs
2	Machico	8	4	4	0	11	3	+8	16	Qualification for the Promotion play-offs
3	Camacha	7	4	3	0	11	5	+6	15	
4	Castro Daire	8	3	4	1	10	6	+4	13	
5	Sanjoanense	8	3	3	2	10	9	+1	12	
6	Salgueiros	8	2	5	1	6	6	0	11	
7	Florgrade	8	3	2	3	8	10	−2	11	
8	União de Lamas	8	2	3	3	9	12	−3	9	
9	Beira-Mar	8	0	7	1	9	11	−2	7	
10	Cinfães	7	1	3	3	6	8	−2	6	
11	Calheta	8	1	3	4	7	13	−6	6	Qualification for the Relegation play-offs
12	Alpendorada	7	1	2	4	7	11	−4	5	Qualification for the Relegation play-offs
13	Guarda	8	1	1	6	3	9	−6	4	Relegation to the District Championship
14	Sousense	7	0	3	4	6	13	−7	3	Relegation to the District Championship

Updated to match(es) played on 8 November 2026. Source: FPF.pt
Rules for classification: 1) Points, 2) Head-to-head points, 3) Head-to-head goal difference, 4) Goal difference, 5) Matches won, 6) Goals scored

=== Serie C ===
Pos	Team	Pld	W	D	L	GF	GA	GD	Pts	Qualification or relegation
1	Marialvas	8	6	1	1	15	4	+11	19	Qualification for the Promotion play-offs
2	Oliveira do Hospital	8	5	2	1	15	10	+5	17	Qualification for the Promotion play-offs
3	O Elvas	8	5	1	2	14	9	+5	16	
4	Mortágua	8	4	3	1	11	5	+6	15	
5	Atlético da Malveira	8	3	3	2	12	11	+1	12	
6	União da Serra	8	3	3	2	11	10	+1	12	
7	Fátima	8	3	2	3	17	12	+5	11	
8	Benfica Castelo Branco	8	3	1	4	11	17	−6	10	
9	Alverca B	8	3	1	4	13	8	+5	10	
10	Nogueirense	8	1	6	1	11	13	−2	9	
11	Nazarenos	8	2	2	4	8	14	−6	8	Qualification for the Relegation play-offs
12	Naval 1893	8	2	1	5	7	11	−4	7	Qualification for the Relegation play-offs
13	Sertanense	8	0	5	3	6	11	−5	5	Relegation to the District Championship
14	Fazendense	8	0	1	7	10	26	−16	1	Relegation to the District Championship

Updated to match(es) played on 8 November 2026. Source: FPF.pt
Rules for classification: 1) Points, 2) Head-to-head points, 3) Head-to-head goal difference, 4) Goal difference, 5) Matches won, 6) Goals scored

=== Serie D ===
Pos	Team	Pld	W	D	L	GF	GA	GD	Pts	Qualification or relegation
1	Sintrense	8	5	2	1	16	7	+9	17	Qualification for the Promotion play-offs
2	Imortal	8	4	2	2	14	8	+6	14	Qualification for the Promotion play-offs
3	Alcochetense	8	4	2	2	15	10	+5	14	
4	Serpa	8	3	4	1	15	9	+6	13	
5	Real	8	3	4	1	16	12	+4	13	
6	Santa Clara B	8	3	2	3	15	11	+4	11	
7	1.º Dezembro	8	3	2	3	7	13	−6	11	
8	Juventude de Évora	8	3	2	3	13	13	0	11	
9	Lajense	9	3	1	5	11	15	−4	10	
10	Amora	8	2	3	3	8	8	0	9	
11	Vitória de Setúbal	8	2	3	3	11	13	−2	9	Qualification for the Relegation play-offs
12	Lagoa	8	2	3	3	9	11	−2	9	Qualification for the Relegation play-offs
13	Portel	9	0	7	2	10	14	−4	7	Relegation to the District Championship
14	Mineiro Aljustrelense	8	0	3	5	3	19	−16	3	Relegation to the District Championship

Updated to match(es) played on 15 November 2026. Source: FPF.pt
Rules for classification: 1) Points, 2) Head-to-head points, 3) Head-to-head goal difference, 4) Goal difference, 5) Matches won, 6) Goals scored

== See also ==
- 2026–27 Primeira Liga
- 2026–27 Liga Portugal 2
- 2026–27 Liga 3
- 2026–27 Taça da Liga
- 2026–27 Taça de Portugal
