= 2026–27 Taça de Portugal =

Taça de Portugal Generali Tranquilidade

Tournament details
- Country: Portugal
- Dates: 30 August 2026 – 30 May 2027
- Teams: 146

The 2026–27 Taça de Portugal (also known as Taça de Portugal Generali Tranquilidade for sponsorship reasons) is the 87th edition of the Taça de Portugal, the premier knockout competition in Portuguese football. The competition is contested by a total of 146 teams (excluding reserve or B teams) representing the top four national levels of the Portuguese football league system and the fifth-level district leagues and cups.

The tournament began on 30 August 2026 with the first round, involving teams from the third, fourth and fifth tiers, and will conclude with the final at the Estádio Nacional in Oeiras on 30 May 2027. The first-tier Primeira Liga teams entered the competition in the third round, with the exception of those who qualified for UEFA competitions in the previous season, who entered in the fourth round.

Defending cup holders Torreense were eliminated in the fourth round by Benfica.

== Format ==
Round	Clubs remaining	Clubs involved	Winners from previous round	New entries this round	Leagues (tier) and clubs entering at this round
First round	146	113	none	113	Liga 3 (3): 19 teams Campeonato de Portugal (4): 52 teams District Football Associations (5): 42 teams
Second round	99	80	47+19	14	Liga Portugal 2 (2): 14 teams
Third round	59	54	40	14	Primeira Liga (1): 14 teams
Fourth round	32	32	27	5	Porto (1), Sporting CP (1), Benfica (1), Braga (1) and Torreense (2)
Fifth round	16	16	16	none	none
Quarter-finals	8	8	8	none	none
Semi-finals	4	4	4	none	none
Final	2	2	2	none	none

== Teams ==
A total of 146 teams are competing in the 2026–27 edition, comprising 18 teams from the Primeira Liga (tier 1), 15 teams from the Liga Portugal 2 (tier 2), 19 teams from the Liga 3 (tier 3), 52 teams from the Campeonato de Portugal (tier 4) and 42 teams from the District championships and cups (tier 5).

Primeira Liga (1); 18 clubs of the 2026–27 season	Liga Portugal 2 (2); 15 clubs of the 2026–27 season	Liga 3 (3); 19 clubs of the 2026–27 season		Campeonato de Portugal (4); 52 clubs of the 2026–27 season				District championships and cups (5); 42 clubs of the 2026–27 season		
Académico de Viseu; Alverca; Arouca; Benfica; Braga; Casa Pia; Estoril; Estrela da Amadora; Famalicão; Gil Vicente; Marítimo; Moreirense; Nacional; Porto; Rio Ave; Santa Clara; Sporting CP; Vitória de Guimarães	Académica; Amarante; AVS; Chaves; Farense; Feirense; Felgueiras; Leixões; Lusitânia Lourosa; Penafiel; Portimonense; Tondela; Torreense; União de Leiria; Vizela	Série A: Fafe; Leça; Marco 09; Paços de Ferreira; Paredes; São João de Ver; Trofense; Varzim; Vianense	Série B: Atlético CP; Belenenses; Caldas; Louletano; Lusitano Évora; Mafra; Oliveirense; Sp. Covilhã; União de Santarém; Vitória Sernache	Série A: Bragança; Brito; Celoricense; Limianos; Maia Lidador; Maria da Fonte; Montalegre; Ponte da Barca; Rebordosa; Tirsense; Vila Meã; Vinhais	Série B: Alpendorada; Beira-Mar; Camacha; Castro Daire; Cinfães; Estrela da Calheta; Florgrade; Guarda FC; Machico; Ovarense; Salgueiros; Sanjoanense; Sousense; União de Lamas	Série C: Benfica Castelo Branco; Fátima; Fazendense; Juventude Lajense; Malveira; Marialvas; Mortágua; Naval 1893; Nazarenos; Nogueirense; O Elvas; Oliveira do Hospital; Sertanense; União da Serra	Série D: 1º Dezembro; Alcochetense; Amora; Imortal; Juventude SC; Lagoa; Mineiro Aljustrelense; Portel; Real SC; Serpa; Sintrense; Vitória FC	Algarve FA: Ferreiras; Olhanense; Angra do Heroísmo FA: Barreiro; Angrense; Aveiro FA: Espinho; Paços de Brandão; São Roque; Beja FA: Messejanense; Castrense; Braga FA: Merelinense; Pevidém; Bragança FA: Rebordelo; Argozelo; Castelo Branco FA: Académico do Fundão; Alcains	Coimbra FA: Ançã; Figueirense; Sourense; Évora FA: Sporting Viana do Alentejo; GUS Montemor; Guarda FA: Fornos de Algodres; Horta FA: Madalena; Fayal; Leiria FA: Bombarralense; União de Pombal; Lisbon FA: Futebol Benfica; Sacavenense; Madeira FA none	Ponta Delgada FA: CD Santo António; Portalegre FA: Os Gavionenses; Portalegrense; Porto FA: Ermesinde; União Nogueirense; Santarém FA: Mação; Moçarriense; Setúbal FA: O Grandolense; Olímpico Montijo; Viana do Castelo FA: Atlético dos Arcos; ADC Correlhã; Vila Real FA: Vila Pouca; Régua; Viseu FA: Lamelas; Penalva do Castelo

== First round ==
The draw for the first round was held on 3 August 2026. It featured a total of 113 teams, including 19 representatives from the Liga 3 (third level), 52 from the Campeonato de Portugal (fourth level) and 42 from the District Championships (fifth level). 19 teams were drawn a bye to the second round, leaving 94 teams to contest the first round. These teams were grouped according to geographical criteria into seven series of five teams and three series of four teams.

Matches were played mostly on 28–30 August 2026. The 47 winners advanced to the second round.

Number of teams per tier in the competition at the start of this round
Primeira Liga (1)	Liga Portugal 2 (2)	Liga 3 (3)	Campeonato de Portugal (4)	District Championships (5)	Total
18 / 18	15 / 15	19 / 19	52 / 52	42 / 42	146 / 146

Team 1	Score	Team 2
28 August 2026
Beira-Mar (4)	3–3 (5–4 p)	União de Lamas (4)
29 August 2026
Varzim (3)	5–1	Trofense (3)
Paços de Ferreira (3)	0–1	Fafe (3)
Oliveirense (3)	4–0	Penalva do Castelo (5)
Fátima (4)	3–1	Benfica Castelo Branco (4)
Malveira (4)	2–3	Mafra (3)
Olímpico Montijo (5)	0–4	Atlético CP (3)
Serpa (4)	2–0	O Grandolense (5)
30 August 2026
Montalegre (4)	0–0 (4–5 p)	Ponte da Barca (4)
Rebordelo (5)	0–4	Bragança (4)
ADC Correlhã (5)	1–4	Limianos (4)
Vianense (3)	8–0	Argozelo (5)
Merelinense (5)	2–0	Atlético dos Arcos (5)
Maia Lidador (4)	0–0 (4–3 p)	Vila Meã (4)
Celoricense (4)	1–0	Pevidém (5)
Maria da Fonte (4)	1–0	União Nogueirense (5)
Machico (4)	2–2 (2–4 p)	Camacha (4)
Salgueiros (4)	2–1	Sousense (4)
Ermesinde (5)	1–3	Paredes (3)
Rebordosa (4)	2–2 (4–5 p)	Alpendorada (4)
Régua (5)	0–1	Marco 09 (3)
Sanjoanense (4)	3–0	Paços de Brandão (5)
Florgrade (4)	0–0 (13–12 p)	São João de Ver (3)
Cinfães (4)	1–0	Espinho (5)
Fornos de Algodres (5)	0–4	Marialvas (4)
Oliveira do Hospital (4)	1–0	Sourense (5)
Nogueirense (4)	1–3	Naval 1893 (4)
Académico do Fundão (5)	0–6	Guarda FC (4)
Sp. Covilhã (3)	0–0 (2–4 p)	Mortágua (4)
Mação (5)	5–0	Os Gavionenses (5)
Alcains (5)	1–0	Sertanense (4)
União da Serra (4)	5–0	União de Pombal (5)
Nazarenos (4)	0–3	Vitória Sernache (3)
Portalegrense (5)	0–3	CD Santo António (5)
Fazendense (4)	1–0	Moçarriense (5)
Caldas (3)	1–3	Sintrense (4)
1º Dezembro (4)	0–1	Real SC (4)
Barreiro (5)	2–5	Madalena (5)
Sacavenense (5)	5–0	Angrense (5)
GUS Montemor (5)	1–4	Juventude SC (4)
Futebol Benfica (5)	3–0	Sporting Viana do Alentejo (5)
Lusitano Évora (3)	1–2	Belenenses (3)
Castrense (5)	0–1	Louletano (3)
Messejanense (5)	0–8	Portel (4)
Ferreiras (5)	0–3	Mineiro Aljustrelense (4)
6 September 2026
O Elvas (4)	9–0	São Roque (5)
Alcochetense (4)	8–0	Fayal (5)

== Second round ==
The draw for the second round was held simultaneously with the first round on 3 August 2026. It featured a total of 80 teams, including 14 (except non-reserve/B teams and Torreense) representatives from the Liga Portugal 2 (second level), the 47 winners of the first round (unknown at the time of the draw) and the 19 teams given a bye to the second round. The only condition of this draw was that all second-tier teams must play their matches away.

Matches will be played on 19–20 September 2025. The 40 winners advanced to the third round.

Number of teams per tier in the competition at the start of this round
Primeira Liga (1)	Liga Portugal 2 (2)	Liga 3 (3)	Campeonato de Portugal (4)	District Championships (5)	Total
18 / 18	15 / 15	13 / 19	40 / 52	13 / 42	99 / 146

Team 1	Score	Team 2
18 September 2026
Real SC (4)	1–4	Académica (2)
19 September 2026
Imortal (4)	1–5	Tondela (2)
Castro Daire (4)	0–1	Portimonense (2)
Naval 1893 (4)	0–2	Felgueiras (2)
Vitória Sernache (3)	2–1	Varzim (3)
Atlético CP (3)	4–1	Lagoa (4)
Salgueiros (4)	1–0	Feirense (2)
Oliveirense (3)	1–2	Penafiel (2)
Lamelas (5)	4–1	CD Santo António (5)
O Elvas (4)	0–2	União de Leiria (2)
Mafra (3)	2–2 (4–3 p)	Tirsense (4)
Beira-Mar (4)	0–2	Belenenses (3)
20 September 2026
Fafe (3)	4–0	Juventude Lajense (4)
Sacavenense (5)	0–1	Farense (2)
Estrela da Calheta (4)	1–3	Vianense (3)
Cinfães (4)	0–4	Leixões (2)
Serpa (4)	1–2 (a.e.t.)	Louletano (3)
Oliveira do Hospital (4)	3–2	Juventude SC (4)
Alcochetense (4)	2–0	Futebol Benfica (5)
Fátima (4)	4–1	Vinhais (4)
União de Santarém (3)	5–0	Merelinense (5)
Ovarense (4)	0–1	Marialvas (4)
Mortágua (4)	0–2	Leça (3)
Guarda FC (4)	2–3	Chaves (2)
Limianos (4)	3–0	Mineiro Aljustrelense (4)
Sintrense (4)	0–2	AVS (2)
Alpendorada (4)	3–0	Mação (5)
Olhanense (5)	1–0 (a.e.t.)	Portel (4)
Ançã (5)	1–4	Sanjoanense (4)
Vila Pouca (5)	0–5	Brito (4)
Fazendense (4)	6–1	Figueirense (5)
Ponte da Barca (4)	0–2	Amarante (2)
Bragança (4)	6–1	Celoricense (4)
Madalena (5)	1–3	Lusitânia Lourosa (2)
Amora (4)	3–4	União da Serra (4)
Alcains (5)	0–2	Vitória FC (4)
Bombarralense (5)	0–1	Vizela (2)
Paredes (3)	5–1	Maria da Fonte (4)
Marco 09 (3)	1–0	Maia Lidador (4)
27 September 2026
Camacha (4)	0–1	Florgrade (4)

== Third round ==
The draw for the third round was held on 23 September 2026. It featured a total of 54 teams, including 14 representatives from the Primeira Liga (first level) and the 40 winners of the second round. The only condition of this draw was that all first-tier teams must play their matches away.

Matches were played on 14–18 October 2026. The 27 winners advanced to the fourth round.

Number of teams per tier in the competition at the start of this round
Primeira Liga (1)	Liga Portugal 2 (2)	Liga 3 (3)	Campeonato de Portugal (4)	District Championships (5)	Total
18 / 18	14 / 15	11 / 19	14 / 52	2 / 42	59 / 146

Team 1	Score	Team 2
14 October 2026
União de Santarém (3)	2–3 (a.e.t.)	Gil Vicente (1)
16 October 2026
Chaves (2)	2–1	Marialvas (4)
17 October 2026
AVS (2)	1–0	Moreirense (1)
Lamelas (5)	0–1	Vitória de Guimarães (1)
Sanjoanense (4)	1–0	Nacional (1)
Farense (2)	3–0	Marco 09 (3)
Atlético (3)	1–0	Vizela (2)
Vianense (3)	1–0	Leixões (2)
Florgrade (4)	1–2	Portimonense (2)
Fazendense (4)	1–2	Estrela da Amadora (1)
União de Leiria (2)	2–1	Bragança (4)
Penafiel (2)	0–1	Leça (3)
Louletano (3)	0–1	Rio Ave (1)
Académica (2)	3–2	Amarante (2)
18 October 2026
Belenenses (3)	3–4 (a.e.t.)	Arouca (1)
Fátima (4)	1–0	Académico de Viseu (1)
Salgueiros (4)	1–1 (1–4 p)	Estoril (1)
Alcochetense (4)	1–2	Marítimo (1)
Tondela (2)	2–0 (a.e.t.)	Alverca (1)
Mafra (3)	3–2 (a.e.t.)	Santa Clara (1)
Alpendorada (4)	0–1	Casa Pia (1)
Felgueiras (2)	1–0	Fafe (3)
Olhanense (5)	1–1 (6–5 p)	Oliveira do Hospital (4)
Lusitânia de Lourosa (2)	2–1	Limianos (4)
Vitória de Setúbal (4)	1–1 (2–4 p)	União da Serra (4)
Brito (4)	0–1	Vitória de Sernache (3)
Paredes (3)	1–0	Famalicão (1)

== Fourth round ==
Number of teams per tier in the competition at the start of this round
Primeira Liga (1)	Liga Portugal 2 (2)	Liga 3 (3)	Campeonato de Portugal (4)	District Championships (5)	Total
12 / 18	10 / 15	6 / 19	3 / 52	1 / 42	32 / 146

Team 1	Score	Team 2
20 November 2026
Porto (1)	1–1 (3–1 p)	Paredes (3)
21 November 2026
Vitória de Guimarães (1)	0–2	Braga (1)
Sporting CP (1)	4–0	União da Serra (4)
Atlético (3)	1–0	Casa Pia (1)
Mafra (3)	2–1	Arouca (1)
Marítimo (1)	0–0 (3–2 p)	Chaves (2)
Estoril (1)	2–3	Felgueiras (2)
AVS (2)	1–5	Tondela (2)
22 November 2026
Torreense (2)	1–3	Benfica (1)
Gil Vicente (1)	3–1	Olhanense (5)
Vianense (3)	1–0	Rio Ave (1)
Farense (2)	1–0	Fátima (4)
Vitória de Sernache (3)	0–1	Lusitânia de Lourosa (2)
União de Leiria (2)	4–2 (a.e.t.)	Leça (3)
Sanjoanense (4)	1–2	Académica (2)
Estrela da Amadora (1)	1–0	Portimonense (2)

== Fifth round ==
Number of teams per tier in the competition at the start of this round
Primeira Liga (1)	Liga Portugal 2 (2)	Liga 3 (3)	Campeonato de Portugal (4)	District Championships (5)	Total
7 / 18	6 / 15	3 / 19	0 / 52	0 / 42	16 / 146

Team 1	Score	Team 2
15 December 2026
Sporting CP (1)		Atlético (3)
União de Leiria (2)		Porto (1)
Marítimo (1)		Lusitânia de Lourosa (2)
Gil Vicente (1)		Braga (1)
Felgueiras (2)		Estrela da Amadora (1)
Benfica (1)		Tondela (2)
Vianense (3)		Mafra (3)
Farense (2)		Académica (2)
