= 2026–27 S.L. Benfica season =

Benfica
2026–27 season
- President: Rui Costa
- Head coach: Marco Silva
- Stadium: Estádio da Luz
- Primeira Liga: 2nd
- Taça de Portugal: Fourth round
- Taça da Liga: Semi-finals
- UEFA Europa League: League phase
- Top goalscorer: League: Vangelis Pavlidis (10); All: Vangelis Pavlidis (18)
- Highest home attendance: 63,112 v Estoril (31 August 2026)
- Lowest home attendance: 53,654 v Gil Vicente (29 October 2026)
- Average home league attendance: 48,675
- Biggest win: Benfica 7–0 Casa Pia (17 August 2026)
- Biggest defeat: Porto 3–1 Benfica (20 September 2026)
Home colours	Away colours	Third colours

The 2026–27 Sport Lisboa e Benfica season is the club's 123rd season in existence and its 93rd consecutive season in the top flight of Portuguese football. Domestically, Benfica plays in the Primeira Liga, and also compete in the Taça da Liga and Taça de Portugal. In Europe, Benfica plays in the UEFA Europa League.

== Players ==
=== First-team squad ===
As of 11 September 2026

Note: Flags indicate national team as defined under FIFA eligibility rules; some limited exceptions apply. Players may hold more than one non-FIFA nationality.

No.	Pos.	Nation	Player
1	GK	UKR	Anatoliy Trubin
2	DF	FRA	Clément Lenglet (on loan from Atlético Madrid)
3	DF	AUS	Alessandro Circati
5	MF	ARG	Enzo Barrenechea
6	DF	DEN	Alexander Bah
8	MF	NOR	Fredrik Aursnes (captain)
10	MF	UKR	Heorhiy Sudakov
11	FW	BEL	Dodi Lukébakio
13	MF	POL	Jakub Kamiński
14	FW	GRE	Vangelis Pavlidis
16	MF	POR	Manu Silva
18	MF	LUX	Leandro Barreiro
21	FW	NOR	Andreas Schjelderup
22	FW	COL	Jhon Durán (on loan from Al-Nassr)

No.	Pos.	Nation	Player
24	GK	POR	Samuel Soares
25	FW	ARG	Gianluca Prestianni
26	DF	SWE	Samuel Dahl
27	FW	POR	Rafa Silva
30	MF	ARG	Claudio Echeverri (on loan from Manchester City)
33	DF	BRA	Gabriel Índio
34	DF	MAR	Souffian El Karouani (on loan from Al-Qadsiah)
36	MF	POR	João Palhinha
44	DF	POR	Tomás Araújo (vice-captain)
50	GK	POR	Diogo Ferreira
58	DF	POR	Daniel Banjaqui
62	DF	POR	José Neto
72	FW	POR	Anísio Cabral

== Transfers ==
=== In ===
No.	Pos	Player	Transferred from	Fee	Date	Source
Summer transfers
2	DF	(France) Clément Lenglet	(Spain) Atlético Madrid	Loan	30 June 2026	
5	MF	(Argentina) Enzo Barrenechea	(England) Aston Villa	€12,000,000	1 July 2026	
10	MF	(Ukraine) Heorhiy Sudakov	(Ukraine) Shakhtar Donetsk	€20,250,000	1 July 2026	
13	FW	(Poland) Jakub Kamiński	(Germany) 1. FC Köln	€17,000,000	7 July 2026	
22	FW	(Colombia) Jhon Durán	(Saudi Arabia) Al-Nassr	Loan (€6,100,000)	20 July 2026	
33	DF	(Brazil) Gabriel Índio	(Brazil) Athletic	€4,000,000	26 July 2026	
3	DF	(Australia) Alessandro Circati	(Italy) Parma	€18,000,000	19 August 2026	
36	MF	(Portugal) João Palhinha	(Germany) Bayern Munich	€14,000,000	26 August 2026	
34	DF	(Morocco) Souffian El Karouani	(Saudi Arabia) Al-Qadisiyah	Loan	1 September 2026	
30	MF	(Argentina) Claudio Echeverri	(England) Manchester City	Loan	2 September 2026	
Disclosed total
€91,350,000

=== Out ===
No.	Pos	Player	Transferred to	Fee	Date	Source
Summer transfers
15	DF	(Cape Verde) Sidny Lopes Cabral	(Turkey) Trabzonspor	€7,000,000	4 June 2026	
—	DF	(Portugal) Rafael Rodrigues	(United Arab Emirates) Al Ain	€2,500,000	10 June 2026	
61	MF	(Portugal) Florentino	(England) Burnley	€24,000,000	12 June 2026	
64	DF	(Portugal) Gonçalo Oliveira	(France) Stade Rennais	€3,500,000	20 June 2026	
76	DF	(Brazil) Gustavo Marques	(Brazil) Red Bull Bragantino	€3,500,000	26 June 2026	
93	MF	(France) Beni Souza	(Portugal) Estrela da Amadora	Undisclosed	30 June 2026	
—	MF	(Turkey) Orkun Kökçü	(Turkey) Beşiktaş	€25,000,000	1 July 2026	
30	DF	(Argentina) Nicolás Otamendi	(Argentina) River Plate	Free	1 July 2026	
67	FW	(Portugal) Rodrigo Rêgo	(England) Brighton	€3,500,000	1 July 2026	
86	MF	(Portugal) Diogo Prioste	(Portugal) Gil Vicente	Loan	3 July 2026	
68	MF	(Portugal) João Veloso	(Portugal) Moreirense	Loan	13 July 2026	
—	GK	(Portugal) André Gomes	(Portugal) Casa Pia	€500,000	20 July 2026	
—	FW	(Portugal) Gustavo Varela	(Italy) AC Monza	€2,000,000	27 July 2026	
39	FW	(Portugal) Henrique Araújo	(Portugal) Casa Pia	Undisclosed	28 July 2026	
4	DF	(Portugal) António Silva	(England) Bournemouth	€25,000,000	1 August 2026	
—	MF	(Portugal) Gil Neves	(Germany) Koln	Undisclosed	7 August 2026	
9	FW	(Croatia) Franjo Ivanović	(France) Lens	Loan (€2,500,000)	12 August 2026	
3	DF	(Spain) Rafael Obrador	(Italy) Sassuolo	Loan	14 August 2026	
17	DF	(Bosnia and Herzegovina) Amar Dedić	(England) Newcastle United	€35,900,000	18 August 2026	
47	FW	(Portugal) Tiago Gouveia	(Turkey) Gençlerbirliği	Loan	20 August 2026	
84	MF	(Portugal) João Rego	(Portugal) Casa Pia	Loan	22 August 2026	
95	MF	(Luxembourg) Tomás Moreira	(Turkey) Bodrum	Undisclosed	2 September 2026	
20	MF	(Colombia) Richard Ríos	(Saudi Arabia) Al-Ittihad	Loan (€4,000,000)	3 September 2026	
66	DF	(United States) Joshua Wynder	(United States) New England Revolution	Loan	3 September 2026	
–	MF	(Portugal) Rafael Luís	(Turkey) Gençlerbirliği	Undisclosed	4 September 2026	
7	FW	(Portugal) Bruma	(Greece) Aris	Free	11 September 2026	
Disclosed total
€138,900,000

== Pre-season friendlies ==
Win Draw Loss

The pre-season began on 25 June 2026.

11 July 2026 Algarve Cup	Benfica (Portugal)	1–2	(Brazil) Flamengo	Faro/Loulé, Portugal
19:30 WEST	Pavlidis 45+8'	Report	(yellow card) 35' (goal) 45' Lino; (yellow card) 39' Pulgar; (yellow card) 45' Henrique; 68' Wallace Yan; (yellow card) 81' Saúl	Stadium: Estádio Algarve

17 July 2026 Friendly	Benfica (Portugal)	2–0	(Spain) Villarreal	Faro/Loulé, Portugal
19:30 WEST	Rafa 53'; Enzo (yellow card) 55'; Pavlidis 76'	Report	(yellow card) 31' Moreno	Stadium: Estádio Algarve

24 July 2026 Friendly	Benfica (Portugal)	5–1	(Portugal) Belenenses	Lisbon, Portugal
18:00 WEST	Anísio 2'; Ivanović 38' (pen.); Prestianni 45', 55'; Durán 54'	Report	33' Bruninho	Stadium: Estádio da Luz; Referee: Luís Godinho (Évora)

== Competitions ==
=== Overall record ===
Competition	First match	Last match	Starting round	Record							
Competition	First match	Last match	Starting round	Pld	W	D	L	GF	GA	GD	Win %
Primeira Liga	9 August 2026	16 May 2027	Matchday 1	11	9	1	1	30	10	+20	81.82
Taça de Portugal	22 November 2026		Fourth round	1	1	0	0	3	1	+2	100.00
Taça da Liga	29 October 2026		Quarter-finals	1	1	0	0	4	1	+3	100.00
UEFA Europa League	23 July 2026		Second qualifying round	10	8	1	1	32	9	+23	80.00
Total				23	19	2	2	69	21	+48	82.61

Last updated: 22 November 2026
Source: Soccerway

=== Primeira Liga ===
==== League table ====
Pos	Team	Pld	W	D	L	GF	GA	GD	Pts	Qualification or relegation
1	Porto	11	11	0	0	27	5	+22	33	Qualification for the Champions League league phase
2	Benfica	11	9	1	1	30	10	+20	28	Qualification for the Champions League league phase
3	Sporting CP	11	7	3	1	24	11	+13	24	Qualification for the Champions League third qualifying round
4	Santa Clara	11	6	3	2	16	8	+8	21	Qualification for the Europa League second qualifying round (Note: The 2026–27 Taça de Portugal winners qualify for the Europa League league phase (or the fourth-placed team of the Primeira Liga if the Taça de Portugal winners finish in the top three). If the Taça de Portugal winners finish in the top four of the Primeira Liga, the Europa League second qualifying round spot will be passed to the fifth-placed team. If the Taça de Portugal winners finish in the top five of the Primeira Liga, the Conference League spot will be passed to the sixth-placed team.)
5	Arouca	11	6	2	3	13	8	+5	20	Qualification for the Conference League second qualifying round

Updated to match(es) played on 8 November 2026. Source: Liga Portugal
Rules for classification: 1) Points; 2) Head-to-head points; 3) Head-to-head goal difference; 4) Goal difference; 5) Matches won; 6) Goals scored; 7) Play-off.

==== Results summary ====
Overall								Home						Away					
Pld	W	D	L	GF	GA	GD	Pts	W	D	L	GF	GA	GD	W	D	L	GF	GA	GD
11	9	1	1	30	10	+20	28	4	1	0	10	4	+6	5	0	1	20	6	+14

Last updated: 2 November 2026.
Source: Liga Portugal

==== Results by round ====
Round	1	2	4	5	3^{1}	6	7	8	9	10	11	12	13	14	15	16	17	18	19	20	21	22	23	24	25	26	27	28	29	30	31	32	33	34
Ground	H	A	A	H	A	H	A	H	A	H	A	H	A	H	A	H	A	A	H	H	A	H	A	H	A	H	A	H	A	H	A	H	A	H
Result	D	W	W	W	W	W	L	W	W	W	W																							
Position	6	4	5	3	2	2	2	2	2	2	2	2																						
Points	1	4	7	10	13	16	16	19	22	25	28																							

Updated to match(es) played on 2 November 2026. Source: [Liga Portugal]
A = Away; H = Home; W = Win; D = Draw; L = Loss
Notes:
- Positions show the situation at the end of the corresponding Game Weeks (GW), not the position at the conclusion of matches or game days.

^{1} Matchday 3 (vs Moreirense) was postponed to 9 September 2026.

==== Matches ====
9 August 2026 1	Benfica	2–2	Académico de Viseu	Lisbon
20:30 WEST (UTC+1)	Pavlidis 10'; Sudakov (yellow card) 25'; Araújo (yellow card) 45'; Prestianni 58'	Report	Mestanza (yellow card) 15'; Correia (yellow card) 18'; Pereira 55'; Clóvis 67'; Ceitil (yellow card) 79'; Milioransa (yellow card) 90+2'	Stadium: Estádio da Luz; Attendance: 0 Referee: David Silva (Porto)

16 August 2026 2	Casa Pia	0–7	Benfica	Rio Maior
20:30 WEST (UTC+1)	Pérez (yellow card) 62'; Khaly (yellow card) 79' (yellow-red card) 90+2'	Report	Prestianni 3'; Rafa Silva 14'; Pavlidis 47', 49', 54'; Ofori 54' (o.g.); Durán 61'	Stadium: Estádio Municipal de Rio Maior; Attendance: 6,437; Referee: João Pinheiro (Braga)

31 August 2026 4	Benfica	2–1	Estoril	Lisbon
18:45 WEST (UTC+1)	Pavlidis 40'; Lenglet 51'	Report	Sierra (yellow card) 75'; Begraoui 82'	Stadium: Estádio da Luz; Attendance: 63,112; Referee: Hélder Carvalho (Santarém)

5 September 2026 5	Marítimo	0–3	Benfica	Funchal
18:00 WEST (UTC+1)	Danilović (yellow card) 40'; Julião (yellow card) 42'	Report	Barreiro 7', 71'; Sudakov (yellow card) 41'; Araújo (yellow card) 61'; Prestianni 82'	Stadium: Estádio do Marítimo; Attendance: 10,103; Referee: Sérgio Guelho (Guarda)

9 September 2026 3	Moreirense	0–4	Benfica	Moreira de Cónegos
20:15 WEST (UTC+1)	Batista (yellow card) 41'; Parsemain (yellow card) 44'; Landerson (yellow card) 52'; Stjepanović (yellow card) 87'	Report	Pavlidis 45+4' (pen.); Schjelderup 55'; Prestianni 59'; Aursnes 72'; Palhinha (yellow card) 75'; Durán (yellow card) 90+1'	Stadium: Parque de Jogos Comendador Joaquim de Almeida Freitas; Attendance: 5,878; Referee: Fábio Veríssimo (Leiria)

13 September 2026 6	Benfica	3–1	Gil Vicente	Lisbon
18:00 WEST (UTC+1)	Barrenechea (yellow card) 12'; Pavlidis 29', 87' (pen.); Palhinha (yellow card) 63'; Prestianni 90+3'	Report	Hernández 7' (yellow card) 26'; Lucão (yellow card) 70'; Esgaio (yellow card) 90+5'	Stadium: Estádio da Luz; Attendance: 62,455; Referee: João Gonçalves (Porto)

20 September 2026 7	Porto	3–1	Benfica	Porto
20:30 WEST (UTC+1)	Veiga (yellow card) 5', (goal) 31'; Froholdt 54'; Hwang In-beom 60', (yellow card) 80'; Pietuszewski (yellow card) 90+2'	Report	Lenglet (yellow card) 25' (red card) 35'; Prestianni (yellow card) 34'; Bah 51', (yellow card) 90+3'	Stadium: Estádio do Dragão; Attendance: 49,560; Referee: Miguel Nogueira (Lisbon)

11 October 2026 8	Benfica	2–0	Vitória de Guimarães	Lisbon
18:00 WEST (UTC+1)	Dahl 24'; Barreiro (yellow card) 52'; Araújo (yellow card) 55'; Sudakov 75'	Report	Strata (yellow card) 17'; G. Nogueira (yellow card) 33'; Borevković (yellow card) 50'; Samu (yellow card) 57'; Balieiro (yellow card) 72'	Stadium: Estádio da Luz; Attendance: 63,728; Referee: Luís Godinho (Évora)

26 October 2026 9	Santa Clara	1–2	Benfica	Ponta Delgada
18:45 WET (UTC±0)	Fernando 32' (pen.); Moreira (yellow card) 36'; Pacheco (yellow card) 40'; Romão (yellow card) 90'; Vasconcelos (yellow card) 90+3'	Report	Bah (yellow card) 8'; Pavlidis (yellow card) 59', (goal) 62'; Prestianni 68'; Aursnes (yellow card) 74'; Dahl (yellow card) 88'; Durán (yellow card) 89'	Stadium: Estádio de São Miguel; Attendance: 8,983; Referee: Cláudio Pereira (Aveiro)

2 November 2026 10	Benfica	1–0	Alverca	Lisbon
20:15 WET (UTC±0)	Pavlidis 51' (o.g.); Lenglet (yellow card) 65'	Report	Bojang (yellow card) 15'; Chiquinho (yellow card) 58'; Ian Luccas (yellow card) 63'	Stadium: Estádio da Luz; Attendance: 54,082; Referee: David Silva (Porto)

8 November 2026 11	Estrela da Amadora	2–3	Benfica	Amadora
20:30 WET (UTC±0)	Zvonarek 49' (yellow card) 51'; Antonetti 76'; Alisson (yellow card) 89'	Report	Prestianni 26'; Schappo 68' (o.g.); Pavlidis 90+4'	Stadium: Estádio José Gomes; Attendance: 6114; Referee: António Nobre (Leiria)

30 November 2026 12	Benfica	v	Famalicão	Lisbon
20:15 WET (UTC±0)		Report		Stadium: Estádio da Luz

6 December 2026 13	Nacional	v	Benfica	Funchal
--:-- WET (UTC±0)		Report		Stadium: Estádio da Madeira

13 December 2026 14	Benfica	v	Braga	Lisbon
--:-- WET (UTC±0)		Report		Stadium: Estádio da Luz

20 December 2026 15	Rio Ave	v	Benfica	Vila do Conde
--:-- WET (UTC±0)		Report		Stadium: Estádio do Rio Ave FC

27 December 2026 16	Benfica	v	Sporting CP	Lisbon
--:-- WET (UTC±0)		Report		Stadium: Estádio da Luz

10 January 2027 17	Arouca	v	Benfica	Arouca
--:-- WET (UTC±0)		Report		Stadium: Estádio Municipal de Arouca

17 January 2027 18	Académico de Viseu	v	Benfica	Viseu
--:-- WET (UTC±0)		Report		Stadium: Estádio do Fontelo

24 January 2027 19	Benfica	v	Casa Pia	Lisbon
--:-- WET (UTC±0)		Report		Stadium: Estádio da Luz

31 January 2027 20	Benfica	v	Moreirense	Lisbon
--:-- WET (UTC±0)		Report		Stadium: Estádio da Luz

7 February 2027 21	Estoril	v	Benfica	Estoril
--:-- WET (UTC±0)		Report		Stadium: Estádio António Coimbra da Mota

14 February 2027 22	Benfica	v	Marítimo	Lisbon
--:-- WET (UTC±0)		Report		Stadium: Estádio da Luz

21 February 2027 23	Gil Vicente	v	Benfica	Barcelos
--:-- WET (UTC±0)		Report		Stadium: Estádio Cidade de Barcelos

28 February 2027 24	Benfica	v	Porto	Lisbon
--:-- WET (UTC±0)		Report		Stadium: Estádio da Luz

7 March 2027 25	Vitória de Guimarães	v	Benfica	Guimarães
--:-- WET (UTC±0)		Report		Stadium: Estádio D. Afonso Henriques

14 March 2027 26	Benfica	v	Santa Clara	Lisbon
--:-- WET (UTC±0)		Report		Stadium: Estádio da Luz

21 March 2027 27	Alverca	v	Benfica	Alverca do Ribatejo
--:-- WET (UTC±0)		Report		Stadium: Complexo Desportivo FC Alverca

4 April 2027 28	Benfica	v	Estrela da Amadora	Lisbon
--:-- WEST (UTC+1)		Report		Stadium: Estádio da Luz

11 April 2027 29	Famalicão	v	Benfica	Vila Nova de Famalicão
--:-- WEST (UTC+1)		Report		Stadium: Estádio Municipal 22 de Junho

18 April 2027 30	Benfica	v	Nacional	Lisbon
--:-- WEST (UTC+1)		Report		Stadium: Estádio da Luz

25 April 2027 31	Braga	v	Benfica	Braga
--:-- WEST (UTC+1)		Report		Stadium: Estádio Municipal de Braga

2 May 2027 32	Benfica	v	Rio Ave	Lisbon
--:-- WEST (UTC+1)		Report		Stadium: Estádio da Luz

9 May 2027 33	Sporting CP	v	Benfica	Lisbon
--:-- WEST (UTC+1)		Report		Stadium: Estádio José Alvalade

16 May 2027 34	Benfica	v	Arouca	Lisbon
--:-- WEST (UTC+1)		Report		Stadium: Estádio da Luz

=== Taça de Portugal ===
22 November 2026 Fourth round	Torreense	1–3	Benfica	Torres Vedras
20:45 WET (UTC±0)	Pérez (yellow card) 24'; Drammeh 50'; Reina (yellow card) 52'; Stopira (yellow card) 58'; Jean (yellow card) 70'; Marques (yellow card) 78'; Alfaro (yellow card) 80'	Report	Sudakov (yellow card) 17'; Durán 31'; Lenglet (yellow card) 51'; Prestianni (yellow card) 51' (goal) 64'; Kamiński 85'	Stadium: Estádio Manuel Marques; Referee: João Gonçalves (Porto)

16 December 2026 Fifth round	Benfica	v	Tondela	Lisbon
				Stadium: Estádio da Luz

=== Taça da Liga ===
29 October 2026 Quarter-finals	Benfica	4–1	Gil Vicente	Lisbon
20:45 WET (UTC+00:00)	Lukébakio 36', 54'; Sudakov 41'; Palhinha (yellow card) 67'; Aursnes (yellow card) 76'; Durán 81'	Report	Lausen 56'; Espigares (red card)	Stadium: Estádio da Luz; Attendance: 53,654; Referee: José Bessa (Porto)

5 January 2027 Semi-finals	Porto	v	Benfica	Leiria
20:15 WET (UTC+00:00)		Report		Stadium: Estádio Dr. Magalhães Pessoa

=== UEFA Europa League ===
==== Second qualifying round ====
The draw for the second qualifying round was held on 17 June 2026.

23 July 2026 First leg	St. Gallen (Switzerland)	2–1	(Portugal) Benfica	St. Gallen, Switzerland
20:00 CEST (UTC+2)	Daschner (yellow card) 30'; Balde 37'; Stanić (yellow card) 62'; Gaal 80', (yellow card) 90+4'	Report	Rafa Silva 44'; Pavlidis (yellow card) 65'	Stadium: Kybunpark; Attendance: 17,179; Referee: Luca Pairetto (Italy)

30 July 2026 Second leg	Benfica (Portugal)	5–0 (6–2 agg.)	(Switzerland) St. Gallen	Lisbon, Portugal
20:00 WEST (UTC+1)	Pavlidis 11', 55', 66', 74' (pen.); Lenglet 81'	Report	Stanić (yellow card) 21' (yellow-red card) 57'; Okoroji (yellow card) 50'	Stadium: Estádio da Luz; Attendance: 59,563; Referee: Florian Badstübner (Germany)

==== Third qualifying round ====
The draw for the third qualifying round was held on 20 July 2026.

6 August 2026 First leg	Benfica (Portugal)	6–1	(Scotland) Heart of Midlothian	Lisbon, Portugal
20:00 WEST (UTC+1)	Rafa Silva 3'; Araújo 23'; Prestianni (yellow card) 33' (goal) 59'; Pavlidis 42' (pen.); Bah (yellow card) 79'; Durán 87'; Schjelderup 90+4'	Report	Mendy (yellow card) 41'; Spittal (yellow card) 70'; Renaud 72'; McEntee (yellow card) 84'; Braga (yellow card) 89'	Stadium: Estádio da Luz; Attendance: 60,776; Referee: Marian Barbu (Romania)

13 August 2026 Second leg	Heart of Midlothian (Scotland)	1–1 (2–7 agg.)	(Portugal) Benfica	Edinburgh, Scotland
19:45 BST (UTC+1)	Braga (yellow card) 33'; Magnússon 77'	Report	Lukébakio 79'	Stadium: Tynecastle Park; Attendance: 17,068; Referee: Sander van der Eijk (Netherlands)

==== Play-off round ====
The draw for the play-off round was held on 3 August 2026.

20 August 2026 First leg	Benfica (Portugal)	3–1	(Denmark) AGF	Lisbon, Portugal
20:00 WEST (UTC+1)	R. Silva 2'; Barreiro (yellow card) 9'; Araújo (yellow card) 24'; Barreiro 31'; Pavlidis 45+2' (pen.)	Report	Jørgensen 36'; Tchamche (yellow card) 82'	Stadium: Estádio da Luz; Attendance: 59,147; Referee: Marco Guida (Italy)

27 August 2026 Second leg	AGF (Denmark)	1–3 (2–6 agg.)	(Portugal) Benfica	Randers, Denmark
20:00 CEST (UTC+2)	Camara (yellow card) 25'; Carstensen (yellow card) 45' (goal) 60'	Report	Prestianni 19', 61'; R. Silva 56'	Stadium: Randers Stadium; Attendance: 8,945; Referee: Daniel Siebert (Germany)

==== League phase ====
The league phase draw was held on 28 August 2026.

===== League table =====
Pos	Team	Pld	W	D	L	GF	GA	GD	Pts	Qualification
1	(Portugal) Benfica	4	4	0	0	13	3	+10	12	Advance to round of 16 (seeded)
2	(England) Bournemouth	4	4	0	0	11	2	+9	12	Advance to round of 16 (seeded)
3	(Hungary) Ferencváros	4	4	0	0	11	3	+8	12	Advance to round of 16 (seeded)
4	(Belgium) Union Saint-Gilloise	4	3	1	0	10	2	+8	10	Advance to round of 16 (seeded)
5	(Italy) Juventus	4	3	1	0	11	4	+7	10	Advance to round of 16 (seeded)

Updated to match(es) played on 5 November 2026. Source: UEFA
Rules for classification: League phase tiebreakers

===== Results by round =====
Round	1	2	3	4	5	6	7	8
Ground	A	H	A	H	A	H	A	H
Result	W	W	W	W				
Position	7	3	1	1				
Points	3	6	9	12				

Updated to match(es) played on 25 November 2026. Source: UEFA
A = Away; H = Home; W = Win; D = Draw; L = Loss

===== Matches =====
16 September 2026 1	AC Milan (Italy)	0–2	(Portugal) Benfica	Milan, Italy
21:00 CEST (UTC+02:00)	Pavlović (yellow card) 11'	Report	Lukébakio 16'; El Karouani (yellow card) 26'; Durán (yellow card) 37'; Kamiński 53'; Banjaqui (yellow card) 77'; Barreiro (yellow card) 85'; Pavlidis (yellow card) 90+2'	Stadium: San Siro; Attendance: 68,393; Referee: Jarred Gillett (England)

15 October 2026 2	Benfica (Portugal)	4–1	(Scotland) Celtic	Lisbon, Portugal
20:00 WEST (UTC+01:00)	J. Durán 5' (pen.), 36'; Bah 23', (yellow card) 69'; Dahl (yellow card) 44'; Palhinha (yellow card) 85'; Pavlidis 89'	Report	C. Durán 63'	Stadium: Estádio da Luz; Attendance: 58,870; Referee: Nikola Dabanović (Montenegro)

22 October 2026 3	Omonia (Cyprus)	1–4	(Portugal) Benfica	Nicosia, Cyprus
22:00 EEST (UTC+03:00)	Kakoullis 42'; Diony (yellow card) 90+3'	Report	Négo 14' (o.g.); Pavlidis 49'; Araújo (yellow card) 62'; Aursnes 76'; Palhinha (yellow card) 83'; El Karouani (yellow card) 88'; Prestianni 85', (yellow card) 90'	Stadium: GSP Stadium; Attendance: 14,378; Referee: Jasper Vergoote (Belgium)

5 November 2026 4	Benfica (Portugal)	3–1	(Poland) Lech Poznań	Lisbon, Portugal
20:00 WET (UTC+00:00)	Rafa 6'; Daniel Banjaqui (yellow card) 42'; Manu (yellow card) 60'; Prestianni 67'; Sudakov 90'	Report	Yannick Agnero (yellow card) 27'; Bengtsson 72'	Stadium: Estádio da Luz; Referee: Martin Matoša (Slovenia)

26 November 2026 5	Viktoria Plzeň (Czech Republic)	v	(Portugal) Benfica	Plzeň, Czech Republic
18:45 CET (UTC+01:00)		Report		Stadium: Doosan Arena

10 December 2026 6	Benfica (Portugal)	v	(Greece) OFI Crete	Lisbon, Portugal
20:00 WET (UTC+00:00)		Report		Stadium: Estádio da Luz

21 January 2027 7	N.E.C. (Netherlands)	v	(Portugal) Benfica	Nijmegen, Netherlands
18:45 CET (UTC+01:00)		Report		Stadium: Goffertstadion

28 January 2027 8	Benfica (Portugal)	v	(Netherlands) AZ Alkmaar	Lisbon, Portugal
20:00 WET (UTC+00:00)		Report		Stadium: Estádio da Luz

== Statistics ==
=== Appearances and goals ===
As of 2 November 2026

No.	Pos	Nat	Player	Total		Primeira Liga		Taça de Portugal		Taça da Liga		Europa League	
No.	Pos	Nat	Player	Apps	Goals	Apps	Goals	Apps	Goals	Apps	Goals	Apps	Goals
Goalkeepers
1	GK	(Ukraine) UKR	Anatoliy Trubin	6	0	0	0	0	0	1	0	5	0
24	GK	(Portugal) POR	Samuel Soares	14	0	10	0	0	0	0	0	4	0
50	GK	(Portugal) POR	Diogo Ferreira	0	0	0	0	0	0	0	0	0	0
Defenders
2	DF	(France) FRA	Clément Lenglet	17	2	9	1	0	0	1	0	7	1
3	DF	(Australia) AUS	Alessandro Circati	9	0	1+3	0	0	0	1	0	2+2	0
6	DF	(Denmark) DEN	Alexander Bah	15	2	8	1	0	0	0	0	7	1
26	DF	(Sweden) SWE	Samuel Dahl	18	1	10	1	0	0	1	0	6+1	0
33	DF	(Brazil) BRA	Gabriel Índio	0	0	0	0	0	0	0	0	0	0
34	DF	(Morocco) MAR	Souffian El Karouani	6	0	0+2	0	0	0	1	0	2+1	0
44	DF	(Portugal) POR	Tomás Araújo	17	1	10	0	0	0	0	0	6+1	1
58	DF	(Portugal) POR	Daniel Banjaqui	3	0	2	0	0	0	0	0	1	0
62	DF	(Portugal) POR	José Neto	1	0	0	0	0	0	0	0	1	0
Midfielders
5	MF	(Argentina) ARG	Enzo Barrenechea	11	0	4+1	0	0	0	0	0	5+1	0
8	MF	(Norway) NOR	Fredrik Aursnes	11	2	3+3	1	0	0	0+1	0	3+1	1
10	MF	(Ukraine) UKR	Heorhiy Sudakov	18	2	6+2	1	0	0	1	1	7+2	0
16	MF	(Portugal) POR	Manu Silva	8	0	0+3	0	0	0	0+1	0	3+1	0
18	MF	(Luxembourg) LUX	Leandro Barreiro	14	3	7+1	2	0	0	0	0	4+2	1
30	MF	(Argentina) ARG	Claudio Echeverri	6	0	0+3	0	0	0	1	0	1+1	0
36	MF	(Portugal) POR	João Palhinha	12	0	6+2	0	0	0	1	0	2+1	0
73	MF	(Portugal) POR	Miguel Figueiredo	1	0	0	0	0	0	0	0	1	0
77	MF	(Portugal) POR	Gonçalo Moreira	2	0	0+1	0	0	0	0	0	0+1	0
Forwards
11	FW	(Belgium) BEL	Dodi Lukébakio	16	4	1+8	0	0	0	1	2	2+4	2
13	FW	(Poland) POL	Jakub Kamiński	8	1	0+2	0	0	0	0	0	3+3	1
14	FW	(Greece) GRE	Vangelis Pavlidis	18	18	10	10	0	0	0	0	6+2	8
21	FW	(Norway) NOR	Andreas Schjelderup	19	2	4+6	1	0	0	1	0	2+6	1
22	FW	(Colombia) COL	Jhon Durán	17	5	0+9	1	0	0	1	1	2+5	3
25	FW	(Argentina) ARG	Gianluca Prestianni	18	9	10	6	0	0	0+1	0	4+3	3
27	FW	(Portugal) POR	Rafa Silva	18	5	9+1	1	0	0	0+1	0	6+1	4
72	FW	(Portugal) POR	Anísio Cabral	2	0	0	0	0	0	0+1	0	0+1	0
Players who made an appearance but left the team.
4	DF	(Portugal) POR	António Silva	2	0	0	0	0	0	0	0	2	0
9	FW	(Croatia) CRO	Franjo Ivanović	1	0	0	0	0	0	0	0	0+1	0
17	DF	(Bosnia and Herzegovina) BIH	Amar Dedić	3	0	0+1	0	0	0	0	0	1+1	0
20	MF	(Colombia) COL	Richard Ríos	6	0	0+2	0	0	0	0	0	1+3	0
47	FW	(Portugal) POR	Tiago Gouveia	1	0	0	0	0	0	0	0	0+1	0
84	MF	(Portugal) POR	João Rego	1	0	0	0	0	0	0	0	0+1	0
