= 2026–27 Sporting CP season =

Sporting CP
2026–27 season
- President: Frederico Varandas
- Head coach: Rui Borges (until 1 November); Paulo Fonseca (from 4 November)
- Stadium: Estádio José Alvalade
- Primeira Liga: 3rd
- Taça de Portugal: Fourth round
- Taça da Liga: Semi-finals
- UEFA Champions League: League phase
- Top goalscorer: League: Luis Suárez (8); All: Luis Suárez (12)
Home colours	Away colours	Third colours

The 2026–27 season is the 134th season in the history of Sporting CP, and the club's 93rd consecutive season in the top flight of Portuguese football. In addition to the domestic league, the club is participating in this season's editions of the Taça de Portugal, the Taça da Liga, and the UEFA Champions League.

== Players ==
=== Current squad ===
As of 2 August 2026

Note: Flags indicate national team as defined under FIFA eligibility rules; some limited exceptions apply. Players may hold more than one non-FIFA nationality.

No.	Pos.	Nation	Player
1	GK	POR	Rui Silva
4	MF	DEN	Silas Andersen
5	MF	ESP	Sergi Altimira
6	DF	BEL	Zeno Debast
7	FW	GRE	Fotis Ioannidis
8	MF	POR	João Simões
9	FW	POR	Rafael Nel
10	FW	MOZ	Geny Catamo
11	DF	POR	Nuno Santos
12	GK	POR	João Virgínia
13	DF	GRE	Georgios Vagiannidis
14	MF	GEO	Giorgi Kochorashvili
17	MF	URU	Rodrigo Zalazar
20	FW	URU	Maximiliano Araújo
21	MF	BRA	Pedro Lima

No.	Pos.	Nation	Player
22	DF	ESP	Iván Fresneda
25	DF	POR	Gonçalo Inácio (3rd captain)
26	DF	CIV	Ousmane Diomande
28	FW	ENG	Jesse Derry (on loan from Chelsea)
31	FW	BRA	Luis Guilherme
41	GK	BRA	Diego Callai
51	DF	SEN	Ibrahima Ba
8	MF	POR	João Simões
58	MF	POR	Flávio Gonçalves
72	DF	POR	Eduardo Quaresma
77	MF	ITA	Issa Doumbia
80	MF	FRA	Koba Koindredi
97	FW	COL	Luis Suárez
99	GK	POR	Francisco Silva

=== Other players under contract ===
Note: Flags indicate national team as defined under FIFA eligibility rules; some limited exceptions apply. Players may hold more than one non-FIFA nationality.

No.	Pos.	Nation	Player
32	MF	ARG	Mateo Tanlongo

== Transfers ==
=== In ===
Pos.	Player	Transferred from	Fee	Date	Source
Summer transfers
FW	(Uruguay) Rodrigo Zalazar	(Portugal) Braga	€30,000,000	15 May 2026	
MF	(Italy) Issa Doumbia	(Italy) Venezia	€20,530,000	1 June 2026	
MF	(Spain) Sergi Altimira	(Spain) Real Betis	€18,250,000	30 June 2026	
MF	(Denmark) Silas Andersen	(Sweden) BK Häcken	€7,250,000	1 July 2026	
MF	(Brazil) Pedro Lima	(Portugal) AVS	€4,000,000	1 July 2026	
FW	(England) Jesse Derry	(England) Chelsea	Loan	8 July 2026	
DF	(Senegal) Ibrahima Ba	(Portugal) Famalicão	€21,250,000	22 July 2026	
FW	(Australia) Nestory Irankunda	(England) Watford	€15,000,000	15 August 2026	
DF	(Morocco) Moncef Zekri	(Belgium) KV Mechelen	€3,000,000	25 August 2026	
GK	(Brazil) Kaique Pereira	(Brazil) Palmeiras	€4,000,000	29 August 2026	
Disclosed total
€123,280,000

=== Out ===
Pos.	Player	Transferred to	Fee	Date	Source
Summer transfers
FW	(Brazil) Alisson Santos	(Italy) Napoli	€16,500,000	5 June 2026	
MF	(Portugal) Alexandre Brito	(Cyprus) Pafos	Free	1 July 2026	
DF	(Portugal) Diogo Travassos	(Portugal) SC Braga	€5,500,000	1 July 2026	
FW	(Brazil) Biel	(Cyprus) Pafos	Loan	2 July 2026	
FW	(Portugal) Geovany Quenda	(England) Chelsea	€50,780,000	8 July 2026	
MF	(Denmark) Morten Hjulmand	(Spain) Atlético Madrid	€40,000,000	11 July 2026	
FW	(Portugal) Francisco Trincão	(Saudi Arabia) Al-Ahli	€39,350,000	18 July 2026	
DF	(Portugal) Ricardo Mangas	(Italy) Monza	Loan	24 July 2026	
MF	(Japan) Hidemasa Morita	(England) Hull City	Free	24 July 2026	
FW	(Senegal) Souleymane Faye	(France) FC Lorient	Loan	2 August 2026	
DF	(Ivory Coast) Ousmane Diomande	(England) Nottingham Forest	€40,000,000	11 August 2026	
MF	(Georgia (country)) Giorgi Kochorashvili	(Spain) Sevilla	€4,500,000	21 August 2026	
GK	(Portugal) João Virgínia	(England) Wolverhampton Wanderers	€1,500,000	27 August 2026	
MF	(Portugal) Daniel Bragança	(Italy) Torino	Loan (€1,000,000 fee)	1 September 2026	
MF	(Portugal) Pedro Gonçalves	(Italy) Fiorentina	Loan (€2,500,000 fee)	1 September 2026	
MF	(France) Koba Koindredi	(Switzerland) Lausanne-Sport	Undisclosed	1 September 2026	
Disclosed total
€201,630,000

== Competitions ==
=== Overall record ===
Competition	First match	Last match	Starting round	Final position	Record							
Competition	First match	Last match	Starting round	Final position	Pld	W	D	L	GF	GA	GD	Win %
Primeira Liga	8 August 2026	16 May 2027	Matchday 1	TBD	10	6	3	1	23	11	+12	60.00
Taça de Portugal	21 November 2026	TBD	Fourth round	TBD	0	0	0	0	0	0	+0	—
Taça da Liga	27 October 2026	TBD	Quarter-finals	TBD	1	1	0	0	2	1	+1	100.00
UEFA Champions League	9 September 2026	TBD	League phase	TBD	4	3	0	1	8	4	+4	75.00
Total					15	10	3	2	33	16	+17	66.67

Last updated: 3 November 2026
Source: Soccerway

=== Primeira Liga ===
==== League table ====
Pos	Team	Pld	W	D	L	GF	GA	GD	Pts	Qualification or relegation
1	Porto	11	11	0	0	27	5	+22	33	Qualification for the Champions League league phase
2	Benfica	11	9	1	1	30	10	+20	28	Qualification for the Champions League league phase
3	Sporting CP	11	7	3	1	24	11	+13	24	Qualification for the Champions League third qualifying round
4	Santa Clara	11	6	3	2	16	8	+8	21	Qualification for the Europa League second qualifying round (Note: The 2026–27 Taça de Portugal winners qualify for the Europa League league phase (or the fourth-placed team of the Primeira Liga if the Taça de Portugal winners finish in the top three). If the Taça de Portugal winners finish in the top four of the Primeira Liga, the Europa League second qualifying round spot will be passed to the fifth-placed team. If the Taça de Portugal winners finish in the top five of the Primeira Liga, the Conference League spot will be passed to the sixth-placed team.)
5	Arouca	11	6	2	3	13	8	+5	20	Qualification for the Conference League second qualifying round

Updated to match(es) played on 8 November 2026. Source: Liga Portugal
Rules for classification: 1) Points; 2) Head-to-head points; 3) Head-to-head goal difference; 4) Goal difference; 5) Matches won; 6) Goals scored; 7) Play-off.

==== Results summary ====
Overall								Home						Away					
Pld	W	D	L	GF	GA	GD	Pts	W	D	L	GF	GA	GD	W	D	L	GF	GA	GD
10	6	3	1	23	11	+12	21	3	1	1	11	7	+4	3	2	0	12	4	+8

Source: Liga Portugal

==== Results by round ====
Round	1	2	3	4	5	6	7	8	9	10	11	12	13	14	15	16	17	18	19	20	21	22	23	24	25	26	27	28	29	30	31	32	33	34
Ground	A	H	H	A	H	A	H	A	H	A	H	A	H	A	H	A	H	H	A	A	H	A	H	A	H	A	H	A	H	A	H	A	H	A
Result	D	W	W	W	W	D	D	W	L	W																								
Position	11	6	2	2	2	3	3	3	3																									
Points	1	4	7	10	13	14	15	18	18	21																								

Updated to match(es) played on 25 October 2026. Source: Liga Portugal
A = Away; H = Home; W = Win; D = Draw; L = Loss; P = Postponed

==== Matches ====
8 August 2026 1	Estrela da Amadora	2–2	Sporting CP	Amadora
20:30 WEST (UTC+01:00)	Antonetti 72'; Souza 84'	Report	Zalazar 46'; Ioannidis 59'	Stadium: Estádio José Gomes; Attendance: 7,033; Referee: João Gonçalves

14 August 2026 2	Sporting CP	3–2	Vitória de Guimarães	Lisbon
20:15 WEST (UTC+01:00)	Gonçalves 9'; Ioannidis 22'; Altimira 41'	Report	Samu 66'; Ndoye 68'	Stadium: Estádio José Alvalade; Attendance: 47,531; Referee: David Rafael Silva

22 August 2026 3	Sporting CP	3–1	Alverca	Lisbon
20:30 WEST (UTC+01:00)	Araújo 2'; Matheus Mendes 55' (o.g.); Suárez 60'	Report	Figueiredo 88'	Stadium: Estádio José Alvalade; Attendance: 50,507; Referee: Fábio Veríssimo

28 August 2026 4	Rio Ave	0–4	Sporting CP	Vila do Conde
20:15 WEST (UTC+01:00)		Report	Gonçalves 5'; Catamo 19'; Suárez 26', 37'	Stadium: Estádio dos Arcos; Attendance: 4,664; Referee: Bruno Costa

5 September 2026 5	Sporting CP	2–0	Nacional	Lisbon
20:30 WEST (UTC+01:00)	Suárez 32' (pen.); Gonçalves 49'	Report		Stadium: Estádio José Alvalade; Attendance: 48,699; Referee: João Pinheiro

13 September 2026 6	Famalicão	1–1	Sporting CP	Vila Nova de Famalicão
20:30 WEST (UTC+01:00)	Inácio 90+1' (o.g.)	Report	Suárez 81' (pen.)	Stadium: Estádio Municipal 22 de Junho; Attendance: 4,813; Referee: Luís Godinho

19 September 2026 7	Sporting CP	2–2	Arouca	Lisbon
20:30 WEST (UTC+01:00)	Inácio 3'; Suárez 17'	Report	Fontán 81' (pen.); Nandín 87'	Stadium: Estádio José Alvalade; Attendance: 49,941; Referee: David Rafael Silva

9 October 2026 8	Braga	1–3	Sporting CP	Braga
20:15 WEST (UTC+01:00)	Silva 41' (o.g.)	Report	Suárez 66'; Bernardo 71' (o.g.); Zalazar 82'	Stadium: Estádio Municipal de Braga; Attendance: 20,265; Referee: João Pinheiro

25 October 2026 9	Sporting CP	1–2	Académico de Viseu	Lisbon
20:30 WET (UTC±00:00)	Suárez 62'	Report	João Guilherme 24', 74'	Stadium: Estádio José Alvalade; Attendance: 43,896; Referee: Miguel Nogueira

30 October 2026 10	Casa Pia	0–2	Sporting CP	Rio Maior
20:15 WET (UTC±00:00)		Report	Pedro Lima 13'; Catamo 90+4'	Stadium: Estádio Municipal de Rio Maior; Attendance: 5,478; Referee: Miguel Fonseca

7 November 2026 11	Sporting CP	v	Moreirense	Lisbon
20:30 WET (UTC±00:00)		Report		Stadium: Estádio José Alvalade; Referee: João Gonçalves

29 November 2026 12	Porto	v	Sporting CP	Porto
20:30 WET (UTC±00:00)		Report		Stadium: Estádio do Dragão

6 December 2026 13	Sporting CP	v	Marítimo	Lisbon
--:-- WET (UTC±00:00)		Report		Stadium: Estádio José Alvalade

20 December 2026 14	Gil Vicente	v	Sporting CP	Barcelos
--:-- WET (UTC±00:00)		Report		Stadium: Estádio Cidade de Barcelos

20 December 2026 15	Sporting CP	v	Estoril	Lisbon
--:-- WET (UTC±00:00)		Report		Stadium: Estádio José Alvalade

27 December 2026 16	Benfica	v	Sporting CP	Lisbon
--:-- WET (UTC±00:00)		Report		Stadium: Estádio da Luz

10 January 2027 17	Sporting CP	v	Santa Clara	Lisbon
--:-- WET (UTC±00:00)		Report		Stadium: Estádio José Alvalade

17 January 2027 18	Sporting CP	v	Estrela da Amadora	Lisbon
--:-- WET (UTC±00:00)		Report		Stadium: Estádio José Alvalade

24 January 2027 19	Vitória de Guimarães	v	Sporting CP	Guimarães
--:-- WET (UTC±00:00)		Report		Stadium: Estádio D. Afonso Henriques

31 January 2027 20	Alverca	v	Sporting CP	Alverca do Ribatejo
--:-- WET (UTC±00:00)		Report		Stadium: Complexo Desportivo FC Alverca

7 February 2027 21	Sporting CP	v	Rio Ave	Lisbon
--:-- WET (UTC±00:00)		Report		Stadium: Estádio José Alvalade

14 February 2027 22	Nacional	v	Sporting CP	Funchal
--:-- WET (UTC±00:00)		Report		Stadium: Estádio da Madeira

21 February 2027 23	Sporting CP	v	Famalicão	Lisbon
--:-- WET (UTC±00:00)		Report		Stadium: Estádio José Alvalade

28 February 2027 24	Arouca	v	Sporting CP	Arouca
--:-- WET (UTC±00:00)		Report		Stadium: Estádio Municipal de Arouca

7 March 2027 25	Sporting CP	v	Braga	Lisbon
--:-- WET (UTC±00:00)		Report		Stadium: Estádio José Alvalade

14 March 2027 26	Académico de Viseu	v	Sporting CP	Viseu
--:-- WET (UTC±00:00)		Report		Stadium: Estádio do Fontelo

21 March 2027 27	Sporting CP	v	Casa Pia	Lisbon
--:-- WET (UTC±00:00)		Report		Stadium: Estádio José Alvalade

4 April 2027 28	Moreirense	v	Sporting CP	Moreira de Cónegos
--:-- WEST (UTC+01:00)		Report		Stadium: Parque Moreira de Cóngeos

11 April 2027 29	Sporting CP	v	Porto	Lisbon
--:-- WEST (UTC+01:00)		Report		Stadium: Estádio José Alvalade

18 April 2027 30	Marítimo	v	Sporting CP	Funchal
--:-- WEST (UTC+01:00)		Report		Stadium: Estádio do Marítimo

25 April 2027 31	Sporting CP	v	Gil Vicente	Lisbon
--:-- WEST (UTC+01:00)		Report		Stadium: Estádio José Alvalade

2 May 2027 32	Estoril	v	Sporting CP	Estoril
--:-- WEST (UTC+01:00)		Report		Stadium: Estádio António Coimbra da Mota

9 May 2027 33	Sporting CP	v	Benfica	Lisbon
--:-- WEST (UTC+01:00)		Report		Stadium: Estádio José Alvalade

16 May 2027 34	Santa Clara	v	Sporting CP	Ponta Delgada
--:-- AZST (UTC±00:00)		Report		Stadium: Estádio de São Miguel

=== Taça de Portugal ===
21 November 2026 Fourth round	Sporting CP	v	União da Serra	Lisbon
18:00 WET (UTC±0)		Report		Stadium: Estádio José Alvalade

=== Taça da Liga ===
27 October 2026 Quarter-finals	Sporting CP	2–1	Marítimo	Lisbon
20:15 WET (UTC±0)	Pedro Lima 44', 71'	Report	Butzke 90'	Stadium: Estádio José Alvalade; Attendance: 24,289; Referee: Iancu Vasilica

6 January 2027 Semi-finals	Sporting CP	v	Famalicão	Leiria
20:15 WET (UTC±0)		Report		Stadium: Estádio Dr. Magalhães Pessoa

=== UEFA Champions League ===
==== League phase ====
The league phase draw was held on 27 August 2026.

Pos	Team	Pld	W	D	L	GF	GA	GD	Pts	Qualification
8	(England) Liverpool	4	3	0	1	14	10	+4	9	Advance to round of 16 (seeded)
9	(Belgium) Club Brugge	4	3	0	1	11	7	+4	9	Advance to knockout phase play-offs (seeded)
10	(Portugal) Sporting CP	4	3	0	1	8	4	+4	9	Advance to knockout phase play-offs (seeded)
11	(Spain) Real Betis	4	3	0	1	8	6	+2	9	Advance to knockout phase play-offs (seeded)
12	(Germany) Borussia Dortmund	4	3	0	1	7	5	+2	9	Advance to knockout phase play-offs (seeded)

Updated to match(es) played on 4 November 2026. Source: UEFA
Rules for classification: League phase tiebreakers

Round	1	2	3	4	5	6	7	8
Ground	H	A	H	A	H	A	H	A
Result	W	W	L	W				
Position	6	6	12	10				

Updated to match(es) played on 3 November 2026. Source: UEFA
A = Away; H = Home; W = Win; D = Draw; L = Loss

===== Matches =====
9 September 2026 1	Sporting CP (Portugal)	3–1	(Turkey) Galatasaray	Lisbon, Portugal
20:00 WEST (UTC+1)	Catamo 27'; Suárez 57' (pen.); Zalazar 63'	Report	Inácio 5' (o.g.)	Stadium: Estádio José Alvalade; Attendance: 44,054; Referee: Espen Eskås (Norway)

13 October 2026 2	Lens (France)	0–2	(Portugal) Sporting CP	Lens, France
18:45 CEST (UTC+2)		Report	Suárez 22'; Doumbia 74'	Stadium: Stade Bollaert-Delelis; Referee: Igor Pajač (Croatia)

21 October 2026 3	Sporting CP (Portugal)	2–3	(Austria) LASK	Lisbon, Portugal
20:00 WEST (UTC+1)	Suárez 5' (pen.), 89'	Report	Lang 15'; Kalajdžić 63'; Daněk 68'	Stadium: Estádio José Alvalade; Attendance: 48,965; Referee: Nick Walsh (Scotland)

3 November 2026 4	Shakhtar Donetsk (Ukraine)	0–1	(Portugal) Sporting CP	London, England
17:45 GMT (UTC±0)		Report	Doumbia 59'	Stadium: Stamford Bridge; Attendance: 28,260; Referee: Ivan Kružliak (Slovakia)

25 November 2026 5	Sporting CP (Portugal)	v	(England) Manchester United	Lisbon, Portugal
20:00 WET (UTC±0)		Report		Stadium: Estádio José Alvalade

8 December 2026 6	Roma (Italy)	v	(Portugal) Sporting CP	Rome, Italy
21:00 CET (UTC+1)		Report		Stadium: Stadio Olimpico

20 January 2027 7	Sporting CP (Portugal)	v	(Spain) Barcelona	Lisbon, Portugal
20:00 WEST (UTC+1)		Report		Stadium: Estádio José Alvalade

28 January 2027 8	Manchester City (England)	v	(Portugal) Sporting CP	Manchester, England
20:00 GMT (UTC±0)		Report		Stadium: City of Manchester Stadium

== Statistics ==
=== Appearances and goals ===
No.	Pos	Nat	Player	Total		Primeira Liga		Taça de Portugal		Taça da Liga		UEFA Champions League	
No.	Pos	Nat	Player	Apps	Goals	Apps	Goals	Apps	Goals	Apps	Goals	Apps	Goals
Goalkeepers
1	GK	(Portugal) POR	Rui Silva	11	0	8	0	0	0	1	0	2	0
12	GK	(Portugal) POR	João Virgínia	0	0	0	0	0	0	0	0	0	0
30	GK	(Brazil) BRA	Kaique Pereira	4	0	2	0	0	0	0	0	2	0
41	GK	(Brazil) BRA	Diego Callai	0	0	0	0	0	0	0	0	0	0
99	GK	(Portugal) POR	Francisco Silva	0	0	0	0	0	0	0	0	0	0
Defenders
6	DF	(Belgium) BEL	Zeno Debast	6	0	5	0	0	0	0	0	0+1	0
11	DF	(Portugal) POR	Nuno Santos	0	0	0	0	0	0	0	0	0	0
13	DF	(Greece) GRE	Georgios Vagiannidis	7	0	3+2	0	0	0	1	0	1	0
18	DF	(Morocco) MAR	Moncef Zekri	1	0	0	0	0	0	1	0	0	0
22	DF	(Spain) ESP	Iván Fresneda	14	0	8+2	0	0	0	0	0	2+2	0
25	DF	(Portugal) POR	Gonçalo Inácio	13	1	9	1	0	0	0	0	4	0
26	DF	(Ivory Coast) CIV	Ousmane Diomande	0	0	0	0	0	0	0	0	0	0
50	DF	(Portugal) POR	Rodrigo Dias	2	0	1	0	0	0	0+1	0	0	0
55	DF	(Senegal) SEN	Ibrahima Ba	2	0	2	0	0	0	0	0	0	0
72	DF	(Portugal) POR	Eduardo Quaresma	11	0	4+2	0	0	0	1	0	4	0
Midfielders
4	MF	(Denmark) DEN	Silas Andersen	12	0	2+6	0	0	0	1	0	1+2	0
5	MF	(Spain) ESP	Sergi Altimira	14	1	10	1	0	0	0	0	4	0
8	MF	(Portugal) POR	Pedro Gonçalves	3	0	0	0	0	0	1	0	2	0
14	MF	(Georgia (country)) GEO	Giorgi Kochorashvili	0	0	0	0	0	0	0	0	0	0
17	MF	(Uruguay) URU	Rodrigo Zalazar	10	3	6+2	2	0	0	0	0	1+1	1
19	MF	(Australia) AUS	Nestory Irankunda	10	0	4+4	0	0	0	0	0	2	0
21	MF	(Brazil) BRA	Pedro Lima	5	3	1+2	1	0	0	1	2	0+1	0
23	MF	(Portugal) POR	Daniel Bragança	0	0	0	0	0	0	0	0	0	0
52	MF	(Portugal) POR	João Simões	3	0	0+2	0	0	0	0	0	0+1	0
58	MF	(Portugal) POR	Flávio Gonçalves	11	3	7+2	3	0	0	0	0	0+2	0
73	MF	(Portugal) POR	Eduardo Felicíssimo	2	0	0	0	0	0	1	0	1	0
77	MF	(Italy) ITA	Issa Doumbia	14	2	9+1	0	0	0	0	0	4	2
80	MF	(France) FRA	Koba Koindredi	0	0	0	0	0	0	0	0	0	0
96	MF	(Portugal) POR	Samuel Justo	1	0	0	0	0	0	0+1	0	0	0
Forwards
7	FW	(Greece) GRE	Fotis Ioannidis	14	2	3+6	2	0	0	1	0	1+3	0
9	FW	(Portugal) POR	Rafael Nel	2	0	0+1	0	0	0	0+1	0	0	0
10	FW	(Mozambique) MOZ	Geny Catamo	15	2	8+2	2	0	0	1	0	4	0
20	FW	(Uruguay) URU	Maximiliano Araújo	13	1	8+1	1	0	0	0	0	4	0
28	FW	(England) ENG	Jesse Derry	7	0	0+4	0	0	0	1	0	0+2	0
31	FW	(Brazil) BRA	Luis Guilherme	11	0	3+5	0	0	0	0	0	1+2	0
70	FW	(Portugal) POR	Salvador Blopa	1	0	0	0	0	0	0	0	0+1	0
78	FW	(Portugal) POR	Mauro Couto	1	0	0	0	0	0	0+1	0	0	0
87	FW	(Cape Verde) CPV	Paulo Cardoso	1	0	0	0	0	0	0+1	0	0	0
97	FW	(Colombia) COL	Luis Suárez	14	12	7+3	8	0	0	0	0	4	4
Players who transferred out during the season

- Source: Soccerway
