= Júlio Alves (footballer, born 1994) =

Brazilian footballer

Personal information
- Full name: Júlio Estevão Alves de Melo
- Date of birth: 3 November 1994 (age 32)
- Place of birth: Salgueiro, Brazil
- Height: 1.84 m (6 ft 0 in)
- Position: Forward

Team information
- Current team: Vila Meã

Senior career*
Years	Team	Apps	(Gls)
2013–2015	Salgueiro	23	(2)
2015	CEOV Operário	5	(3)
2016	Cuiabá	0	(0)
2016	Mirassol	0	(0)
2017	São Carlos	13	(1)
2017–2018	Cesarense	28	(14)
2018–2019	Varzim	17	(1)
2019–2020	Lusitânia	21	(2)
2020	→ Olhanense (loan)	3	(0)
2020–2021	Castelo Branco	25	(6)
2021–2023	Tirsense	35	(15)
2023–	Vila Meã	19	(6)
- * Club domestic league appearances and goals as of 08:49, 20 February 2024 (UTC)

Júlio Estevão Alves de Melo (born 3 November 1994), commonly known as Júlio Alves, is a Brazilian footballer who currently plays as a forward for Vila Meã.

== Career ==
=== Salgueiro ===
Júlio scored on his league debut for Salgueiro against Pesqueira FC on 13 March 2013, scoring in the 53rd minute.

=== Operário ===
Júlio scored two goals on his league debut for Operário against Comercial MS on 8 August 2015.

=== São Carlos ===
Júlio made his league debut for São Carlos against Inter de Limeira on 4 February 2017. He scored his first goal for the club against Joseense on 16 April 2017, scoring in the 19th minute.

=== Cesarense ===
Júlio scored two goals on his league debut for Cesarense against Salgueiros on 27 August 2017.

=== Varzim ===
Júlio made his league debut for Varzim against Mafra on 12 August 2018. He scored his first goal for the club against Académica on 19 May 2019, scoring in the 75th minute.

=== Lusitânia ===
Júlio made his league debut for Lusitânia against Pedras Rubras on 18 August 2019. He scored his first goal for the club against Valadares Gaia F.C on 17 November 2019, scoring in the 82nd minute.

=== Olhanense ===
Júlio made his league debut for Olhanense against Lagos on 16 February 2020.

=== Benfica Castelo Branco ===
Júlio made his league debut for Benfica Castelo Branco against Alcains on 20 September 2020. He scored his first goal for the club against Vitória de Sernache on 15 November 2020, scoring a penalty in the 41st minute.

=== Tirsense ===
Júlio made his league debut for Tirsense against Vila Meã on 29 August 2021. He scored his first goal for the club against Mirandela on 3 October 2021, scoring a penalty in the 42nd minute.

=== Vila Meã ===
Júlio made his league debut for Vila Meã against Florgrade FC on 20 August 2023. He scored his first goal for the club against São João Ver on 27 August 2023, scoring in the 90th+1st minute.

== Career statistics ==
As of 20 June 2019

Appearances and goals by club, season and competition
Club	Season	League			State League		National cup		League cup		Other		Total	
Club	Season	Division	Apps	Goals	Apps	Goals	Apps	Goals	Apps	Goals	Apps	Goals	Apps	Goals
Salgueiro	2013	Série D	0	0	8 (Note: Appearances in the Campeonato Pernambucano)	1	1 (Note: Appearances in the Copa do Brasil)	0	–		0	0	9	1
Salgueiro	2014	Série C	3	0	10	1	0	0	–		0	0	13	1
Salgueiro	2015	Série C	0	0	2	0	0	0	–		5 (Note: Appearances in the Copa do Nordeste)	0	7	0
Salgueiro	Total		3	0	20	2	1	0	0	0	5	0	29	2
CEOV Operário	2015	Série D	5	3	0	0	0	0	–		0	0	5	3
Cuiabá	2016	Série C	0	0	0	0	1	0	–		1 (Note: Appearances in the Copa Verde)	0	2	0
São Carlos	2017	–			13 (Note: Appearances in the Campeonato Paulista A3)	1	0	0	–		0	0	13	1
Cesarense	2017–18	Campeonato de Portugal	28	14	–		3 (Note: Appearances in the Taça de Portugal)	2	0	0	0	0	31	16
Varzim	2018–19	LigaPro	17	1	–		1	0	3 (Note: Appearances in the Taça da Liga)	0	0	0	21	1
Career total			54	18	33	3	6	2	3	0	6	0	102	23
