= Nélson Sousa =

French-born Portuguese footballer (born 1984)

Personal information
- Full name: Nélson Manuel Marques de Sousa
- Date of birth: 15 March 1984 (age 42)
- Place of birth: Paris, France
- Height: 1.81 m (5 ft 11 in)
- Position: Defender

Youth career
- 1996–2002: União de Leiria

Senior career*
Years	Team	Apps	(Gls)
2002–2009	União de Leiria	22	(0)
2005–2006	→ Ovarense (loan)	28	(0)
2006–2007	→ Estoril (loan)	10	(0)
2009–2010	Chaves	5	(0)
2010–2011	União da Serra		
2011–2014	Fátima	74	(4)
2014–2015	União de Leiria	10	(0)
2015–2017	Fátima	16	(0)
- * Club domestic league appearances and goals

Nélson Manuel Marques de Sousa (born 15 March 1984) is a Portuguese former footballer who played as a defender. He also holds French citizenship.

== Career ==
Sousa made his Primeira Liga debut for União de Leiria on 17 April 2004 as a starter in a 0–0 draw against Estrela da Amadora.
