= Estádio Municipal Dr. José Vieira de Carvalho =

Football stadium in Maia, Portugal

- Interactive map of Estádio Municipal Dr. José Vieira de Carvalho
- Former names: Estádio Professor Dr. José Vieira de Carvalho
- Location: Maia, Portugal
- Coordinates: 41°14′04.45″N 8°37′05.59″W
- Owner: Municipality of Maia
- Operator: Municipality of Maia
- Capacity: 12,000
- Surface: Grass
- Field size: 104 x 64 m

Construction
- Built: 1930; 96 years ago
- Opened: 1930
- Renovated: 1984, 2015
- Architect: Pedro Lobão

Tenant
- FC Maia Lidador

The Estádio Municipal Dr. José Vieira de Carvalho is a multi-use stadium in Maia, Portugal. It is currently used for track and field athletics, but above all for football matches and was the stadium of the now defunct F.C. Maia and its successor Maia Lidador. The stadium is able to hold 12,000 people.

The stadium is named after José Vieira de Carvalho, a university professor and former president of the Municipality of Maia.

== Portugal national team matches ==
The following national team matches were held in the stadium.

#	Date	Score	Opponent	Competition
1.	19 December 1990	1–0	United States	Friendly

== See also ==
- List of football stadiums in Portugal
