= Flávio Gonçalves =

Portuguese footballer (born 2007)

Personal information
- Full name: Flávio Ferreira Gonçalves
- Date of birth: 30 May 2007 (age 19)
- Place of birth: Mantes-la-Jolie, France
- Height: 1.76 m (5 ft 9 in)
- Positions: Winger; attacking midfielder

Team information
- Current team: Sporting CP
- Number: 58

Youth career
- 2012–2016: CSM Rosny-sur-Seine
- 2016–2019: Rio Ave
- 2019–2024: Sporting CP

Senior career*
Years	Team	Apps	(Gls)
2024–2026	Sporting CP B	45	(11)
2026–	Sporting CP	10	(3)

International career^{‡}
2024–2025	Portugal U18	13	(3)
2025–2026	Portugal U19	12	(5)
2026	Portugal U20	4	(1)
2026–	Portugal U21	2	(0)
- * Club domestic league appearances and goals as of 19:29, 17 October 2026 (UTC) ‡ National team caps and goals as of 19:29, 17 October 2026 (UTC)

Flávio Ferreira Gonçalves (born 30 May 2007) is a Portuguese professional footballer who plays as a winger or attacking midfielder for Primeira Liga club Sporting CP.

== Early life ==
Gonçalves was born on 30 May 2007 in Mantes-la-Jolie, in the Yvelines department of France, where his parents, Portuguese emigrants, had settled. A dual Portuguese and French citizen, he took his first steps in football with CSM Rosny-sur-Seine, in the neighboring town of Rosny-sur-Seine, from 2012 to 2016.

At the age of nine, he was spotted at a seven-a-side football tournament organized in Paris by Paris Saint-Germain by Carlos Rente, the uncle of Hugo Viana and at the time an employee of GestiFute, the agency of Jorge Mendes. Rente convinced the player's father, Paulo, to move the family back to Portugal so that his son could develop there.

== Club career ==
=== Sporting CP ===
==== Youth career (2019–25) ====
After moving to Portugal, he joined Rio Ave following his first training session. His performances drew the attention of Sporting CP. Hugo Viana and club president Frederico Varandas traveled to Vila do Conde in person to bring him to the club's academy in Alcochete, which he joined in 2019. He quickly stood out in the club's youth ranks, and signed a new youth contract with the club on 22 September 2021. Gonçalves signed his first professional contract with Sporting CP on 26 February 2024.

In the 2024–25 season, Gonçalves joined Sporting's reserve team in Liga 3, helping them win promotion to Liga Portugal 2, seven years after leaving the division. On 15 July 2025, he extended his contract with Sporting CP until 2030, naming Pedro Gonçalves, to whom he is regularly compared by the Portuguese press, as his role model in the squad.

==== Rise to the first team (2025–Present) ====
Gonçalves made his first-team debut on 28 October, replacing Geovany Quenda in a 5–1 win over Alverca in the Taça da Liga; he was one of five academy graduates to make their debut that night. On 19 December, with Pedro Gonçalves and Quenda injured, he was permanently promoted to the first-team squad coached by Rui Borges; finishing the season with seven first-team appearances.

Following the departure of Pedro Gonçalves to Fiorentina during the summer transfer window, he established himself in Borges's starting lineup on the left wing. Gonçalves made his first league start on 8 August 2026, on the opening matchday of the 2026–27 Primeira Liga, in a 2–2 draw away to Estrela da Amadora. Six days later, on 14 August, he scored his first goal for the first team in the ninth minute of a 3–2 win over Vitória de Guimarães, and added two more in five appearances. On 9 September, he made his UEFA Champions League debut, coming on as a substitute in Sporting CP's 3–1 win over Galatasaray at the Estádio José Alvalade.

== International career ==
Gonçalves earned his first cap for the Portugal under-18 team on 10 October 2024, going on to make 13 appearances and score three goals at that level.

With the under-19 team, he took part in the qualifying campaign for the 2026 UEFA European Under-19 Championship during the 2025–26 season. Portugal advanced to the elite round but failed to reach the finals after a 6–0 defeat to England on 31 March 2026. He made 12 appearances and scored five goals for the under-19s.

On 19 May 2026, he was named by head coach Oceano Cruz in the 23-man under-20 squad for the 2026 Maurice Revello Tournament. At the tournament, he scored his first goal at that level on 8 June 2026, in the first minute of stoppage time of a 3–1 win over Venezuela. Portugal won the tournament on 13 June 2026 by beating Tunisia 2–0 in the final, its fourth title in the competition and its first in 23 years.

== Style of play ==
A right-footed player standing 1.76 m (5 ft 9 in) and weighing 69 kg (152 lb), Gonçalves is a left winger who can also play as a playmaker. He has been described as a hybrid between a winger and an attacking midfielder, often positioned between the lines, with good technique, an eye for the final pass and a reading of the game considered advanced for his age; his speed, his ability in one-on-one situations, the quality of his crosses and his accuracy in front of goal are frequently highlighted. His main limitations relate to his physique and his effectiveness in physical and aerial duels, areas he has worked on specifically since the summer of 2026.

In his first league start, 61% of his touches came on the left flank, in a noticeably more advanced position than that of Pedro Gonçalves, with whom he is frequently compared.

== Career statistics ==
As of match played 9 October 2026

Appearances and goals by club, season and competition
Club	Season	League			Taça de Portugal		Taça da Liga		Europe		Total	
Club	Season	Division	Apps	Goals	Apps	Goals	Apps	Goals	Apps	Goals	Apps	Goals
Sporting CP B	2024–25	Liga 3	21	5	—		—		—		21	5
Sporting CP B	2025–26	Liga Portugal 2	24	6	—		—		—		24	6
Sporting CP B	Total		45	11	—		—		—		45	11
Sporting CP	2025–26	Primeira Liga	3	0	2	0	2	0	0	0	7	0
Sporting CP	2026–27	Primeira Liga	7	3	0	0	0	0	1 (Note: Appearance in UEFA Champions League)	0	8	3
Sporting CP	Total		10	3	2	0	2	0	1	0	15	3
Career total			55	14	2	0	2	0	1	0	60	14

== Honors ==
Portugal U20

- Maurice Revello Tournament: 2026
