= Tomás Araújo =

Portuguese footballer (born 2002)

- Araújo at the 2026 Fifa World Cup

Personal information
- Full name: Tomás Lemos Araújo
- Date of birth: 16 May 2002 (age 24)
- Place of birth: Vila Nova de Famalicão, Portugal
- Height: 1.87 m (6 ft 2 in)
- Position: Defender

Team information
- Current team: Benfica
- Number: 44

Youth career
- 2010–2015: Operário Famalicão
- 2015: Evolution Soccer Academy
- 2015–2016: Palmeiras FC
- 2016–2022: Benfica

Senior career*
Years	Team	Apps	(Gls)
2020–2022	Benfica B	49	(3)
2021–	Benfica	77	(3)
2022–2023	→ Gil Vicente (loan)	22	(1)

International career^{‡}
2017	Portugal U15	4	(0)
2017–2018	Portugal U16	11	(0)
2018–2019	Portugal U17	18	(0)
2019–2020	Portugal U18	6	(0)
2019–2020	Portugal U19	5	(0)
2021–2022	Portugal U20	5	(0)
2023–2024	Portugal U21	10	(0)
2024–	Portugal	7	(0)
- * Club domestic league appearances and goals as of 23:55, 8 November 2026 (UTC) ‡ National team caps and goals as of 23:32, 1 October 2026 (UTC)

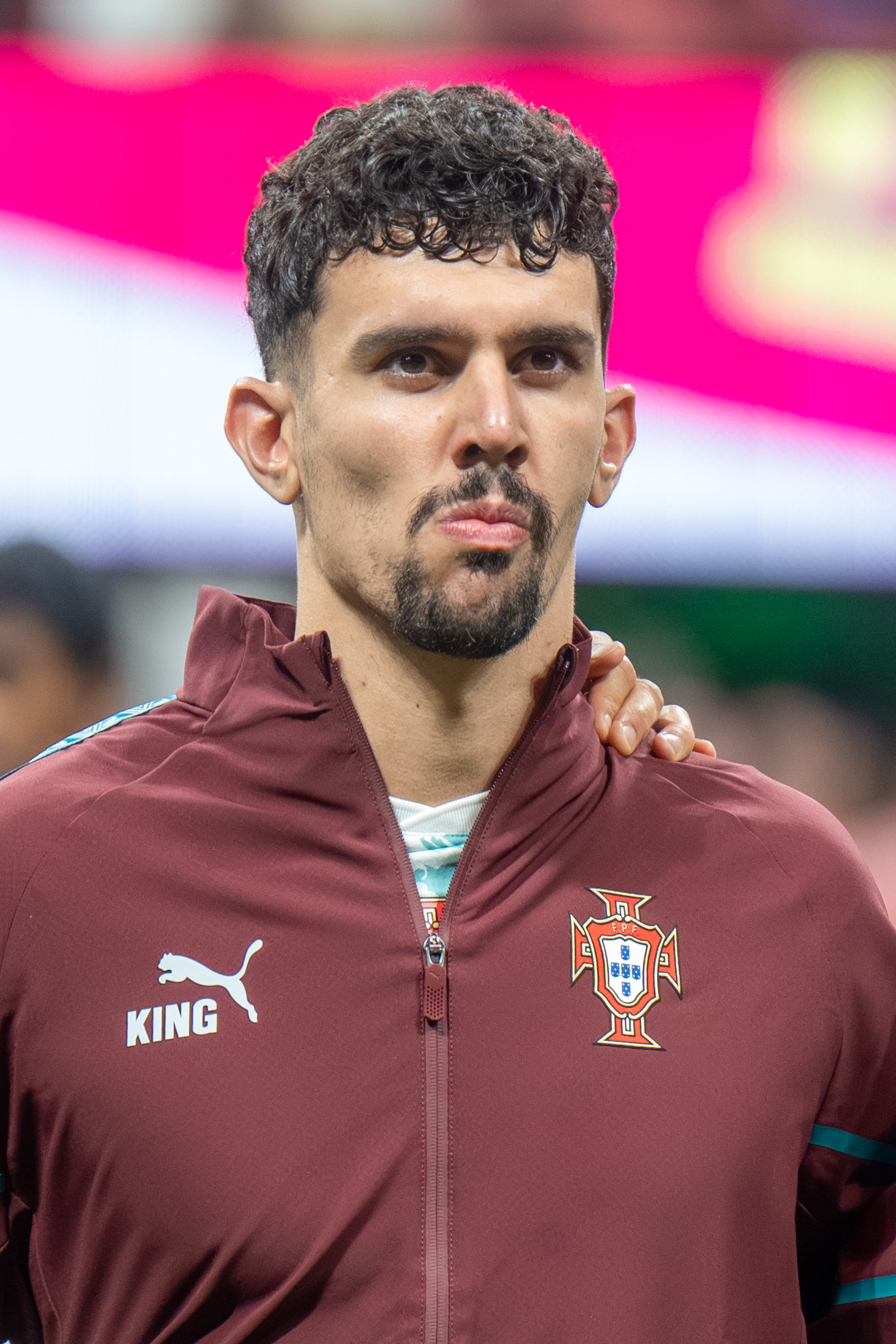
Araújo with Portugal in 2026

Tomás Lemos Araújo (Portuguese pronunciation: [tuˈmaz ɐɾɐˈuʒu]; born 16 May 2002) is a Portuguese professional footballer who plays as a centre-back or a right-back for Primeira Liga club Benfica and the Portugal national team.

Coming through Benfica's youth system, Araújo impressed during his time with the reserve side, winning the UEFA Youth League in 2021–22, being instrumental part of Benfica's first European trophy in 60 years. He was promoted to the first team in 2021, and subsequently loaned to Gil Vicente in 2022. He returned to Benfica in 2023, established himself as an integral player in the following years.

Araújo is a former Portugal youth international, representing his country at various levels. He made his senior international debut in 2024.

== Club career ==
=== Benfica ===
==== 2020–22: Early career ====
Araújo joined Benfica's academy in 2016, aged 14, having previously played at youth level for Operário Famalicão, Palmeiras FC and Evolution Soccer Academy. On 22 May 2018, he signed his first professional contract with Benfica, until 2021.

After rising through the club's youth ranks, Araújo made his professional debut for Benfica's B team on 19 September 2020, coming off the bench to replace Pedro Ganchas on the 71st minute of a 6–0 victory away at Casa Pia, in the Liga Portugal 2. He made his first professional start on 24 October, playing the full 90 minutes in a 1–0 league defeat at home against Académico de Viseu. On 16 January 2021, Araújo scored his first professional goal, the opener in a 2–2 league draw at home to Académica de Coimbra. On 2 March, Araújo signed a new deal with Benfica. The duration of the contract was undisclosed.

On 15 December 2021, aged 19, Araújo made his debut for Benfica's main team, starting and playing the full match in a 3–0 home victory over Sporting da Covilhã in the Taça da Liga. On 27 February 2022, he made his Primeira Liga debut, coming off the bench to replace Jan Vertonghen in extra-time of a 3–0 home victory over Vitória de Guimarães. On 13 May, Araújo made his first Primeira Liga start, playing the full match in a 2–0 victory away at Paços de Ferreira.

==== 2022–24: Loan to Gil Vicente and development ====
On 27 July 2022, Benfica sent Araújo on a season-long loan to fellow Primeira Liga club Gil Vicente. He made his debut for the Barcelos side on 18 August, starting in a 4–0 defeat away to AZ Alkmaar in the play-off round of the UEFA Europa Conference League. On 3 September, he made his first league appearance for Gil Vicente, coming on as a second-half substitute in a 2–0 home defeat to Porto. Araújo scored his first Primeira Liga goal on 5 March 2023, Gil Vicente's second in a 2–0 victory at home against Marítimo.

At the end of the 2022–23 season, Araújo returned to Benfica and, having impressed on loan, on 24 July 2023, he signed a new contract with the Eagles until 2028. On 3 October, Araújo made his UEFA Champions League debut for Benfica, in a group stage match away at Inter Milan, coming off the bench in the first-half to replace the injured Alexander Bah, and playing the rest of the game as a makeshift right-back; Benfica lost 1–0. He scored his first goal for the club on 14 April 2024, in a 3–0 home win over Moreirense in the Primeira Liga. During the match, he sprained his right ankle, forcing him to miss rest of the season.

==== 2024–25: First-team breakthrough ====
In October 2024, following the arrival of new manager Bruno Lage, Araújo earned a place in the starting XI over António Silva, starting in a 4–0 win over Atlético Madrid on 2 October in the Champions League league phase. Due to his passing quality when building from the back and speed, Lage considered him crucial for the team's dynamics, as he aided in covering defensive gaps and recovering quickly, making him a better fit for Lage's system. After capitalizing on his opportunities, with strong performances, he kept his place as a starter, due to also his reliability to play across different positions in the defense. He was named the league's Defender of the Month for November, after helping Benfica in the four-match winning streak, which included two clean sheets.

== International career ==
With the Portugal under-17s, Araújo took participated in the 2019 UEFA European Under-17 Championship in Ireland, playing four matches losing in the quarter-finals to Italy.

On 24 March 2023, he earned his first appearance for the under-21 team, starting in a 2–0 friendly victory against Romania. In June, he took part in the 2023 UEFA European Under-21 Championship. Portugal were eliminated from the tournament, on 2 July, after a 1–0 loss to England in the quarter-finals.

On 8 October 2024, Araújo received his first call-up to the senior squad for the UEFA Nations League matches against Poland and Croatia, as a replacement for the injured Gonçalo Inácio. On 18 November, he made his debut in a 1–1 draw against the latter; Portugal had already secured first place in their group with one fixture remaining.

On 19 May 2026, Araújo was selected in the 26-man squad for the 2026 FIFA World Cup.

== Career statistics ==
=== Club ===
As of match played 8 November 2026

Appearances and goals by club, season and competition
Club	Season	League			Taça de Portugal		Taça da Liga		Europe		Other		Total	
Club	Season	Division	Apps	Goals	Apps	Goals	Apps	Goals	Apps	Goals	Apps	Goals	Apps	Goals
Benfica B	2020–21	Liga Portugal 2	27	1	—		—		—		—		27	1
Benfica B	2021–22	Liga Portugal 2	21	2	—		—		—		—		21	2
Benfica B	2025–26	Liga Portugal 2	1	0	—		—		—		—		1	0
Benfica B	Total		49	3	—		—		—		—		49	3
Benfica	2021–22	Primeira Liga	3	0	0	0	1	0	0	0	—		4	0
Benfica	2023–24	Primeira Liga	13	1	1	0	3	0	3 (Note: Appearances in UEFA Champions League)	0	0	0	20	1
Benfica	2024–25	Primeira Liga	28	1	3	0	2	0	11	0	0	0	44	1
Benfica	2025–26	Primeira Liga	22	1	4	0	2	0	9	0	0	0	37	1
Benfica	2026–27	Primeira Liga	11	0	0	0	0	0	8 (Note: Appearances in UEFA Europa League)	0	—		19	0
Benfica	Total		77	3	8	0	8	0	31	0	0	0	124	3
Gil Vicente (loan)	2022–23	Primeira Liga	22	1	0	0	2	0	2 (Note: Appearances in UEFA Europa Conference League)	0	—		26	1
Career total			148	7	8	0	10	0	33	0	0	0	199	7

=== International ===
As of match played 1 October 2026

Appearances and goals by national team and year
National team	Year	Apps	Goals
Portugal	2024	1	0
Portugal	2025	0	0
Portugal	2026	6	0
Total		7	0

== Honours ==
Benfica B

- UEFA Youth League: 2021–22

Benfica

- Taça da Liga: 2024–25
- Supertaça Cândido de Oliveira: 2023

Individual

- UEFA Youth League Team of the Tournament: 2021–22
- Primeira Liga Defender of the Month: November 2024, February 2025
