= Moncef Zekri =

Moroccan footballer (born 2008)

Personal information
- Date of birth: September 20, 2008 (age 18)
- Place of birth: Brussels, Belgium
- Height: 1.72 m (5 ft 8 in)
- Position: Left-back

Team information
- Current team: Sporting CP
- Number: 18

Youth career
- 2017–2022: OH Leuven
- 2022–2023: Sint-Truiden V.V.
- 2023–: KV Mechelen

Senior career*
Years	Team	Apps	(Gls)
2024–	Jong KV Mechelen	6	(0)
2025–2026	KV Mechelen	20	(0)
2026–	Sporting CP	0	(0)

International career
2024	Morocco U16	1	(0)
2024–2025	Morocco U17	11	(0)
- * Club domestic league appearances and goals as of 9 August 2026

Moncef Zekri (Arabic: منصف زكري, born 20 September 2008) is a Moroccan professional footballer who plays as a left-back for Primeira Liga club Sporting CP. Born in Belgium, he is a youth international for Morocco.

== Club career ==
Born in Brussels, Belgium, Zekri began his youth career at OH Leuven, then moved to Sint-Truiden V.V. in 2022, and later joined KV Mechelen in 2023. He played for the club's reserve side Jong KV Mechelen in the Belgian fourth tier during the 2024–25 season.

He made his senior debut for KV Mechelen on 10 May 2025, replacing Mory Konaté in a league match against Standard Liège. A week later, he started his first match against Sporting Charleroi, which ended in a 1–1 draw. Despite interest from clubs such as Ajax Amsterdam, he signed his first professional contract with KV Mechelen at the end of the season.

== International career ==
In March 2025, Zekri was called up by the Morocco U17s to participate in the 2025 U-17 Africa Cup of Nations, hosted in Morocco.

He was a key starter during the tournament, helping Morocco reach the final after defeating Ivory Coast U17 in a penalty shootout (0–0 regular time).

Morocco then defeated Mali U17 in the final (0–0, 4–2 pen.) to claim their first-ever title in the tournament.

He was named in the CAF team of the tournament and attracted interest from European clubs.

== Honours ==
=== International ===
Morocco U17

- Africa U-17 Cup of Nations: 2025
- UNAF U-17 Tournament: Bronze medal (2024)

=== Individual ===
- CAF Team of the Tournament: 2025
