= Gabriel Índio =

Brazilian footballer

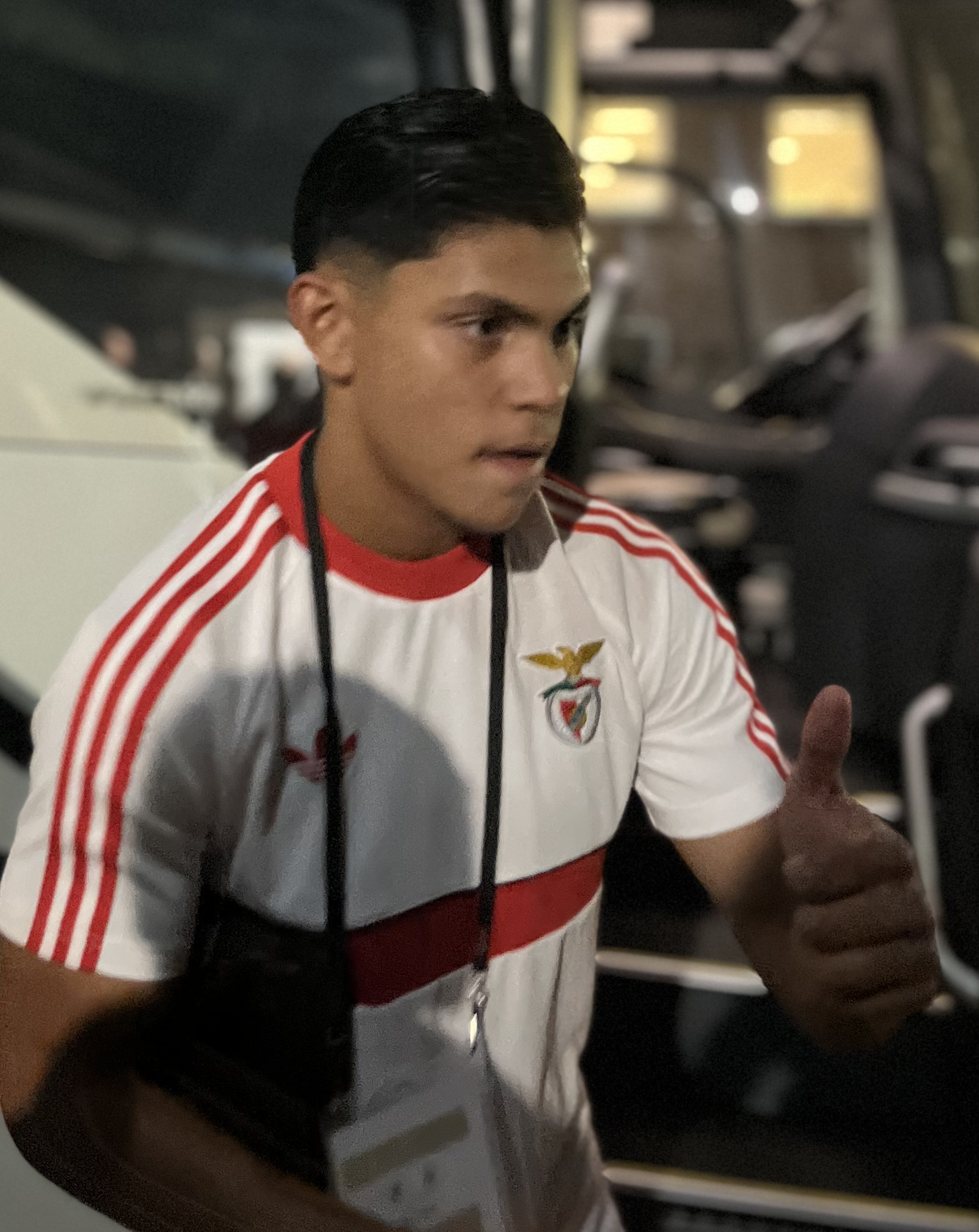
- Índio with Benfica in 2026

Personal information
- Full name: Gabriel dos Santos Queiroz
- Date of birth: July 26, 2008 (age 18)
- Place of birth: Rio de Janeiro, Brazil
- Height: 1.86 m (6 ft 1 in)
- Position: Centre-back

Team information
- Current team: Benfica
- Number: 33

Youth career
- 2021–2023: Flamengo
- 2023–2024: Botafogo
- 2024–2025: Serrano
- 2024–2025: → Athletic (loan)

Senior career*
Years	Team	Apps	(Gls)
2025–2026	Serrano	0	(0)
2025–2026	→ Athletic (loan)	14	(0)
2026	Athletic	4	(0)
2026–	Benfica	0	(0)
- * Club domestic league appearances and goals as of 18:49, 29 July 2026 (UTC)

Gabriel dos Santos Queiroz (born 26 July 2008), known as Gabriel Índio, is a Brazilian professional footballer who plays as a centre-back for Primeira Liga club Benfica.

== Early life and youth career ==
Índio began playing football with the academy of Flamengo, but had to leave after having issues recovering from a bite from a pitbull. He followed that up with spells at Botafogo and Serrano, signing his first professional contract with the latter at the age of 16. He joined Athletic in 2024 where he played for their U17s, and on 2025 was promoted to their senior team in the Campeonato Brasileiro Série B. In February 2026, he formally transferred to Athletic. On 9 May 2026, he extended his contract with the club until 2028.

On 27 July 2026, he transferred to Portuguese Primeira Liga club Benfica on a contract until 2031.

== Personal life ==
Índio's nickname stems from his indigenous ancestry and from having very long hair as a child, which led people to say he resembled an "índio" (Portuguese for "indigenous person").
