= Associação Naval 1893 =

Naval 1893
- Full name: Associação Naval 1893
- Founded: 2017; 9 years ago
- Ground: Estádio Municipal José Bento Pessoa
- Capacity: 9,000
- League: Campeonato de Portugal
- 2025–26: Campeonato de Portugal, Série C, 3rd of 14
- Website: https://www.naval1893.pt/

Associação Naval 1893 is a Portuguese football club from Figueira da Foz, in the Coimbra District. The club was founded in 2017 as a phoenix club of the dissolved Associação Naval 1º de Maio, and plays in the Campeonato de Portugal, the fourth tier of the Portuguese football league system.

== History ==
Associação Naval 1º de Maio was founded in 1893 and competed in the Primeira Liga between 2005 and 2011. In September 2017, in the Coimbra Football Association's district leagues, it suspended its activities and transferred its players of all ages to Naval 1893, a phoenix club set up weeks earlier by its former directors.

In its debut season of 2017–18, the club won promotion from the Coimbra FA's First Division, but remained in its Elite Division until winning the title in 2024–25. For 2025–26, the club entered the Campeonato de Portugal, the fourth tier of the Portuguese football league system. In the Taça de Portugal of the same season, the club won 3–0 at home to Académico Fundão in the first round and lost 1–0 to Leixões in the second, also at the Estádio Municipal José Bento Pessoa.
