= C.D. Celoricense =

- Full name: Clube Desportivo Celoricense
- Founded: 1931; 95 years ago
- League: Campeonato de Portugal
- 2026–27: Série A, 4th of 14

Clube Desportivo Celoricense is a Portuguese football club from Celorico de Basto in the Braga District. Founded in 1931, the club plays in the Campeonato de Portugal, the fourth tier of Portuguese football.

== History ==
Celoricense won the Divisão de Honra, the second tier of the Braga Football Association's district leagues, with three games remaining in 2023–24. This was followed by a second successive promotion by winning the Divisão Pró-Nacional da AF Braga in 2024–25. On 20 August 2025, the club defeated C.D. Celeirós 3–1 in the Supertaça da AF Braga.

In the Taça de Portugal in 2025–26, Celoricense beat Celeirós in the first round, and Liga 3 club C.D. Mafra 1–0 after extra time in the second. In the third round on 18 October, they hosted Primeira Liga leaders FC Porto at the Estádio Cidade de Barcelos, and lost 4–0.
