= Heorhiy Sudakov =

Ukrainian footballer (born 2002)

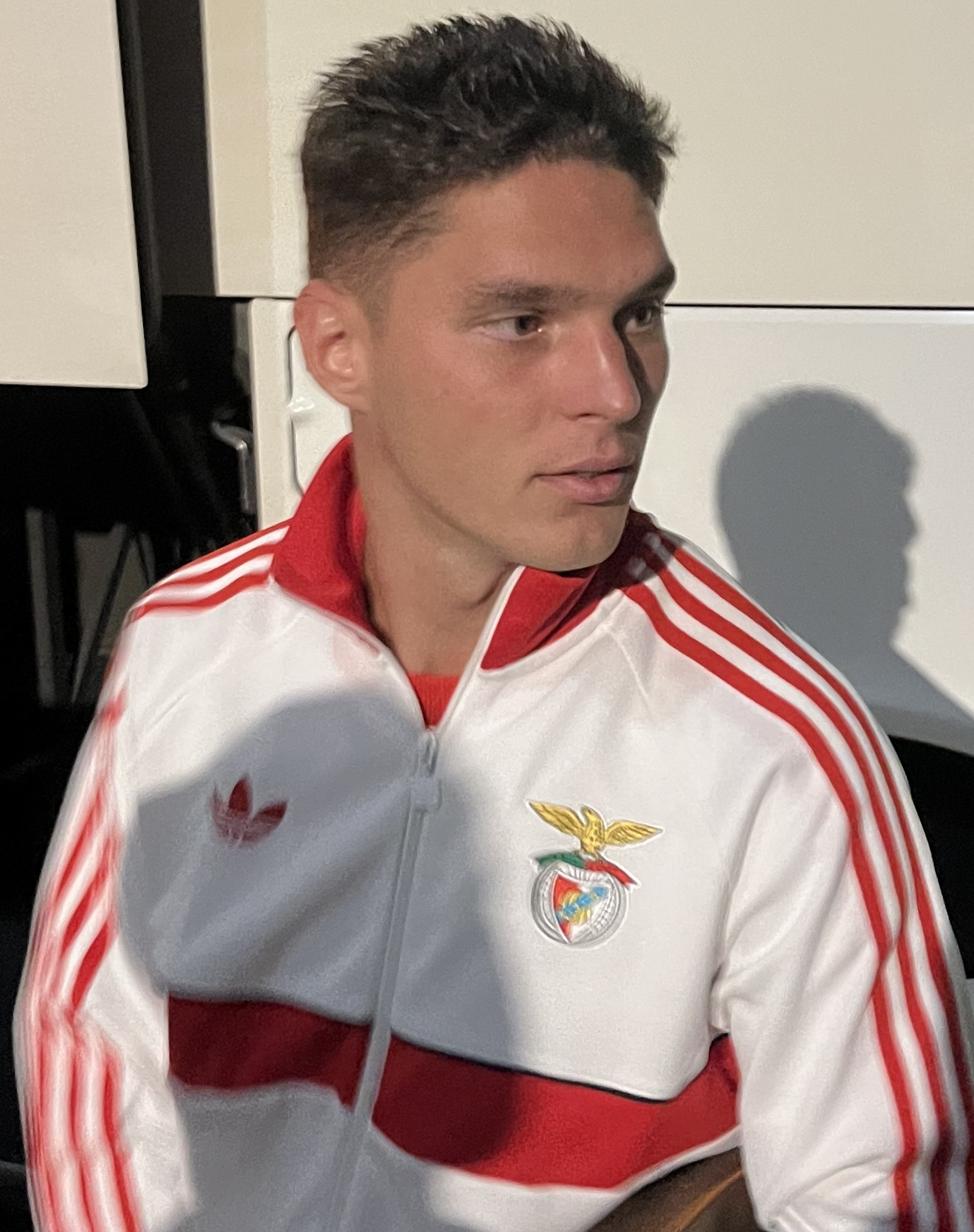
- Sudakov with Benfica in 2026

Personal information
- Full name: Heorhiy Viktorovych Sudakov
- Date of birth: 1 September 2002 (age 24)
- Place of birth: Brianka, Ukraine
- Height: 1.77 m (5 ft 10 in)
- Positions: Attacking midfielder; left midfielder

Team information
- Current team: Benfica
- Number: 10

Youth career
- 2013–2014: Sokil Brianka
- 2014–2017: Metalist Kharkiv
- 2017–2020: Shakhtar Donetsk

Senior career*
Years	Team	Apps	(Gls)
2020–2026	Shakhtar Donetsk	100	(29)
2025–2026	→ Benfica (loan)	22	(4)
2026–	Benfica	9	(1)

International career^{‡}
2018–2019	Ukraine U17	6	(4)
2020–	Ukraine U21	20	(6)
2021–	Ukraine	40	(4)
- * Club domestic league appearances and goals as of 20:26, 8 November 2026 (UTC) ‡ National team caps and goals as of 18 November 2026

Heorhiy Viktorovych Sudakov (Ukrainian: Георгій Вікторович Судаков; born 1 September 2002) is a Ukrainian professional footballer who plays as an attacking midfielder or left midfielder for Primeira Liga club Benfica and the Ukraine national team.

== Club career ==
=== Shakhtar Donetsk ===
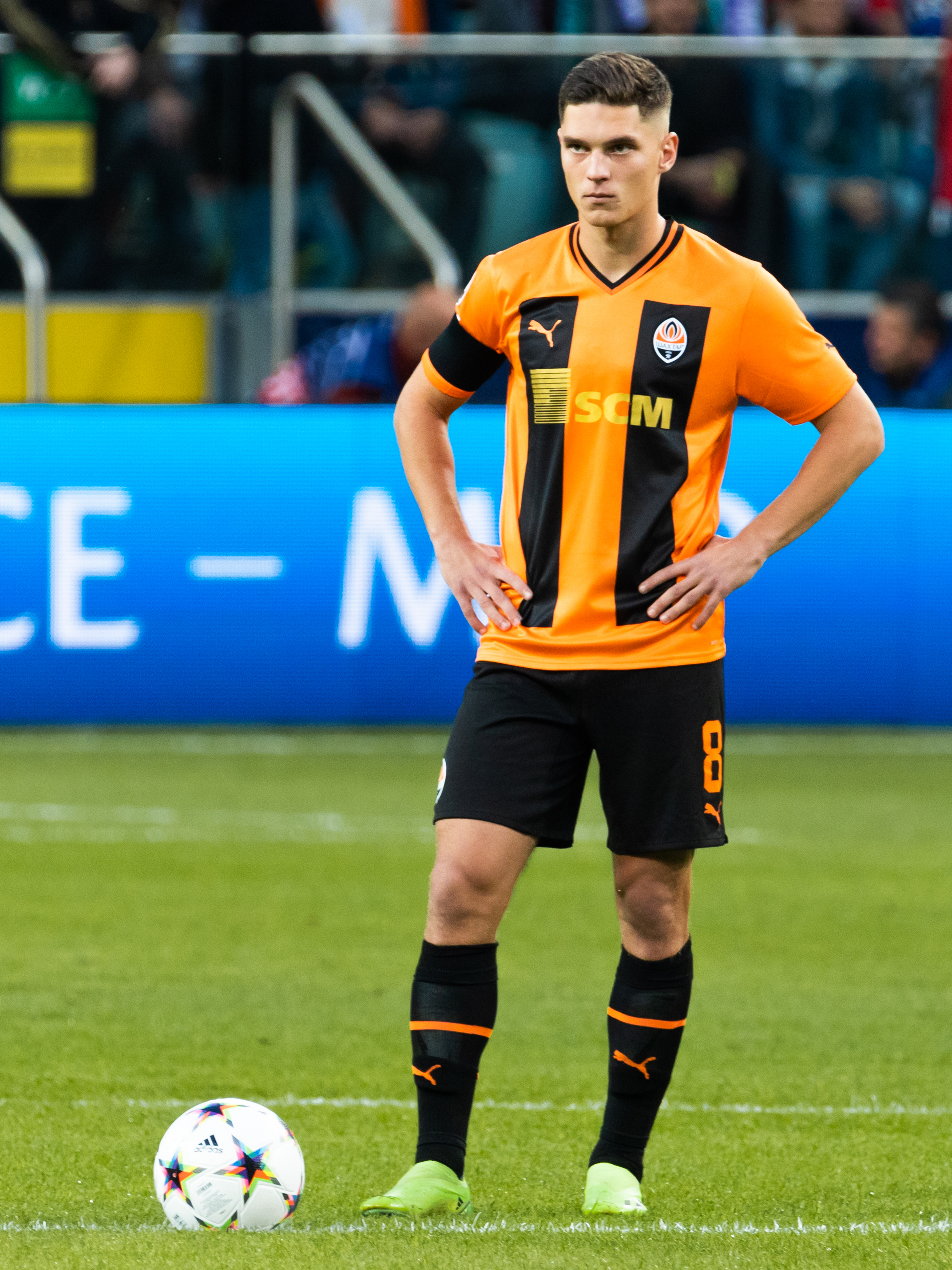
Sudakov with Shakhtar Donetsk in 2022

Sudakov is a product of the different youth sportive schools, who in 2017 joined the Shakhtar Donetsk Academy in the Ukrainian Premier League in 2020. He played in the Ukrainian Premier League Reserves and made his debut for Shakhtar Donetsk in the 2020–21 UEFA Champions League in a winning away match against Real Madrid on 21 October 2020.

On 13 February 2022, Sudakov and Mykhailo Mudryk extended their contracts with Shakhtar Donetsk until 31 December 2026. On 25 October 2023, he scored his first Champions League goal in a 2–1 away defeat against Barcelona. On 1 February 2024, Shakhtar announced that Sudakov had extended his contract with the club until 31 December 2028. Later that year, on 11 May, he netted a penalty in a 1–0 victory over second-placed Dynamo Kyiv, securing his club's 15th league title in the 2023–24 season.

=== Benfica ===
On 30 August 2025, Sudakov transferred to Primeira Liga side Benfica, on a loan fee of €6.75 million with an obligation to buy for €20.25 million, plus €5 million in possible add-ons related to the player's performances, with Shakhtar Donetsk also entitled to 25% of the profit of a future sale. He made his debut for the club on 12 September, replacing Andreas Schjelderup in the 73rd minute in a home match over Santa Clara in the Primeira Liga, and scored his first goal in the competition on 20 September, contributing to a 3–0 away victory over AVS.

== International career ==
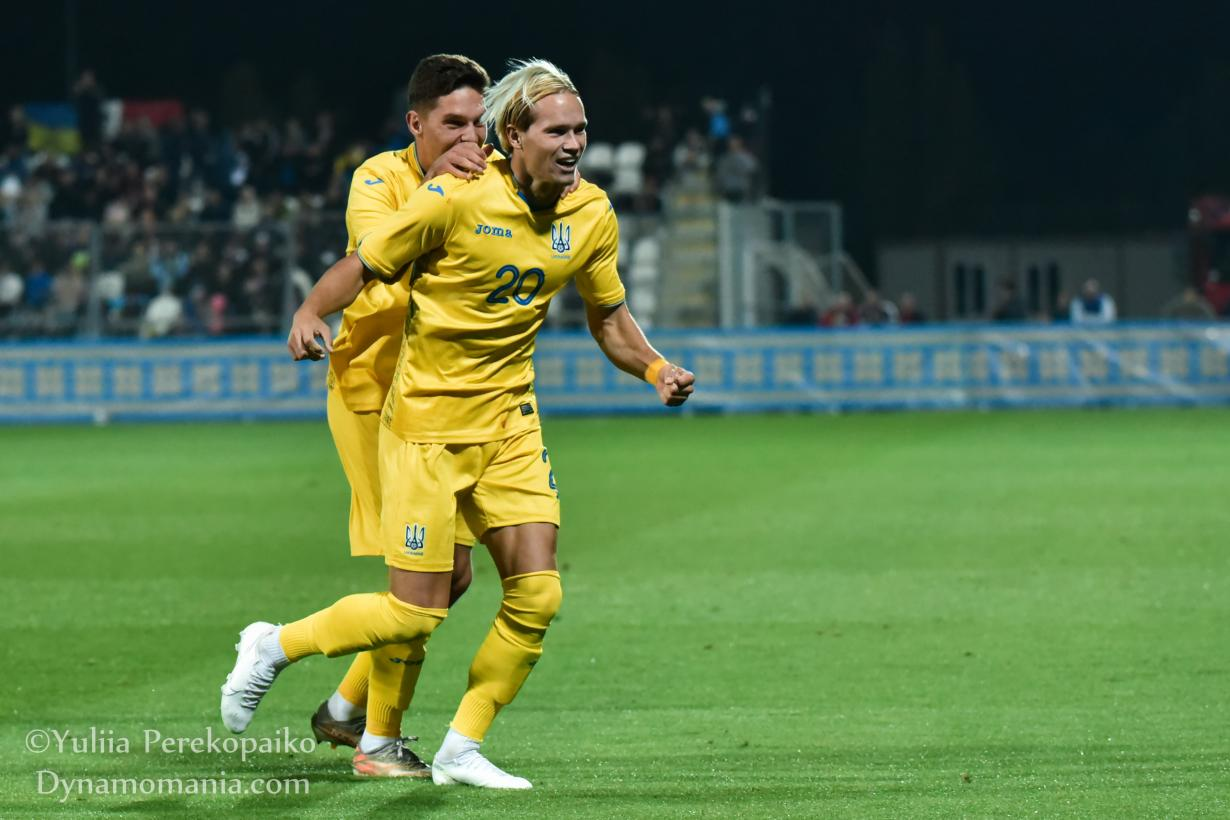
Heorhiy Sudakov and Mykhailo Mudryk playing for Ukraine U21

Sudakov represented Ukraine at under-17 and under-21 levels. He was a part of the Ukraine national under-21 football team squad that qualified to the UEFA European Under-21 Championship semi final.

Sudakov debuted for the Ukrainian senior squad on 23 May 2021 in a friendly match against Bahrain.

In June 2021, he is on the list of 26 players summoned by Andriy Shevchenko to compete for the UEFA Euro 2020.

In May 2024, he was on the list of 26 players summoned by Serhiy Rebrov for the UEFA Euro 2024.

== Career statistics ==
=== Club ===
As of match played 8 November 2026

Appearances and goals by club, season and competition
Club	Season	League			National cup (Note: Includes Ukrainian Cup, Taça de Portugal)		League cup (Note: Includes Taça da Liga)		Europe		Other		Total	
Club	Season	Division	Apps	Goals	Apps	Goals	Apps	Goals	Apps	Goals	Apps	Goals	Apps	Goals
Shakhtar Donetsk	2020–21	Ukrainian Premier League	10	1	1	0	—		3 (Note: One appearance in UEFA Champions League, two appearances in UEFA Europa League)	0	0	0	14	1
Shakhtar Donetsk	2021–22	Ukrainian Premier League	10	4	1	0	—		3 (Note: Appearances in UEFA Champions League)	0	0	0	14	4
Shakhtar Donetsk	2022–23	Ukrainian Premier League	29	5	—		—		10 (Note: Six appearances in UEFA Champions League, four appearances in UEFA Europa League)	0	—		39	5
Shakhtar Donetsk	2023–24	Ukrainian Premier League	23	6	3	2	—		8 (Note: Six appearances and one goal in UEFA Champions League, two appearances and one goal in UEFA Europa League)	2	—		34	10
Shakhtar Donetsk	2024–25	Ukrainian Premier League	25	13	4	0	—		8	2	—		37	14
Shakhtar Donetsk	2025–26	Ukrainian Premier League	3	0	—		—		7 (Note: Five appearances in UEFA Europa League, two appearances in UEFA Conference League)	0	—		10	0
Shakhtar Donetsk	Total		100	29	9	2	—		39	4	0	0	148	35
Benfica (loan)	2025–26	Primeira Liga	22	4	3	0	2	0	9	0	—		36	4
Benfica	2026–27	Primeira Liga	9	1	0	0	1	1	10 (Note: Appearances in UEFA Europa League)	1	—		20	3
Benfica	Benfica total		31	5	3	0	3	1	19	1	—		56	7
Career total			131	34	12	2	3	1	58	5	0	0	204	42

=== International ===
As of match played 17 November 2026

Appearances and goals by national team and year
National team	Year	Apps	Goals
Ukraine	2021	3	0
Ukraine	2022	0	0
Ukraine	2023	9	1
Ukraine	2024	14	2
Ukraine	2025	6	1
Ukraine	2026	8	0
Total		40	4

Scores and results list Ukraine's goal tally first, score column indicates score after each Sudakov goal.

List of international goals scored by Heorhiy Sudakov
No.	Date	Venue	Opponent	Score	Result	Competition
1.	14 October 2023	Stadion Letná, Prague, Czech Republic	North Macedonia	1–0	2–0	UEFA Euro 2024 qualifying
2.	11 June 2024	Zimbru Stadium, Chișinău, Moldova	Moldova	4–0	4–0	Friendly
3.	10 September 2024	Fortuna Arena, Prague, Czech Republic	Czech Republic	2–3	2–3	2024–25 UEFA Nations League B
4.	9 September 2025	Tofiq Bahramov Republican Stadium, Baku, Azerbaijan	Azerbaijan	1–0	1–1	2026 FIFA World Cup qualification

== Honours ==
Shakhtar Donetsk

- Ukrainian Premier League: 2022–23, 2023–24
- Ukrainian Cup: 2023–24, 2024–25

Individual

- Ukrainian Premier League Young Player of the Season: 2019–20
- UEFA European Under-21 Championship top scorer: 2023 (3 goals)
- Shakhtar Donetsk Player of the Year: 2023
- Golden talent of Ukraine: 2023 (U21)
- Primera Liga Goal of the Month: November 2025
