= Diogo Ferreira (footballer, born 2007) =

Portuguese footballer

Personal information
- Full name: Diogo José de Nazaré e Jesus Ferreira
- Date of birth: February 10, 2007 (age 19)
- Place of birth: Viseu, Portugal
- Height: 1.91 m (6 ft 3 in)
- Position: Goalkeeper

Team information
- Current team: Benfica B
- Number: 50

Youth career
- 2016–2017: Académico de Viseu
- 2017–2018: Penalva do Castelo
- 2018–2019: Lusitano FCV
- 2019–2025: Benfica

Senior career*
Years	Team	Apps	(Gls)
2025–	Benfica B	26	(0)

International career^{‡}
2021–2022	Portugal U15	4	(0)
2022–2023	Portugal U16	8	(0)
2023–2024	Portugal U17	15	(0)
2024–2025	Portugal U18	8	(0)
2025–2026	Portugal U19	8	(0)
2026–	Portugal U21	1	(0)
- * Club domestic league appearances and goals as of 19:57, 29 July 2026 (UTC) ‡ National team caps and goals as of 19:57, 29 July 2026 (UTC)

Diogo José de Nazaré e Jesus Ferreira (born 10 February 2007) is a Portuguese professional footballer who plays as a goalkeeper for Benfica B in the Liga Portugal 2.

== Club career ==
Diogo Ferreira is a product of the youth academies of the Portuguese clubs Académico de Viseu, Penalva do Castelo, and Lusitano FCV, before moving to Benfica's academy at the age of 12 in 2019. He won the national under-17 championship with Benfica's youth side in 2022–23. He climbed up all of Benfica's youth teams, and signed his first professional contract with Benfica in 2023 at the age of 16. In October 2023, he started training with Benfica's senior team. On 3 June 2025, he extended his contract with Benfica, and was promoted to their reserves in the Liga Portugal 2.

== International career ==
Ferreira is a youth international for Portugal. He was called up to the Portugal U17s for the 2024 UEFA European Under-17 Championship.
