= 2026–27 Taça da Liga =

Football tournament season in Portugal

Tournament details
- Country: Portugal
- Dates: 27 October 2026 – 9 January 2027
- Teams: 8

Tournament statistics
- Matches played: 4
- Goals scored: 13 (3.25 per match)
- Attendance: 124,615 (31,154 per match)
- Top goal scorer(s): Dodi Lukébakio; Ricardo Horta; Georgios Koutsias; Pedro Lima (2 goals each)

The 2026–27 Taça da Liga will be the twentieth edition of the Taça da Liga (also known as Allianz Cup for sponsorship reasons), a football league cup competition organised by the Liga Portuguesa de Futebol Profissional and contested exclusively by clubs competing in the two professional divisions of Portuguese football – the top-tier Primeira Liga and the second-tier Liga Portugal 2. It was the second season featuring only eight teams in the competition.

== Format ==
As in the season before, the top six teams from the Primeira Liga and the top two non-reserve teams from the Liga Portugal 2 were paired according to their league positions to play single-leg quarter-final matches:

- 1st place (Primeira Liga) vs. 2nd place (Liga Portugal 2)
- 2nd place (Primeira Liga) vs. 1st place (Liga Portugal 2)
- 3rd place (Primeira Liga) vs. 6th place (Primeira Liga)
- 4th place (Primeira Liga) vs. 5th place (Primeira Liga)

The winners qualified to the final-four tournament, which was played at a neutral venue and comprised two single-leg semi-finals and a final. The final four was played at the Estádio Dr. Magalhães Pessoa, in Leiria for the sixth season in a row.

== Qualified teams ==
Team	Tier	Rank
Porto	Primeira Liga	1st place
Sporting CP	Primeira Liga	2nd place
Benfica	Primeira Liga	3rd place
Braga	Primeira Liga	4th place
Famalicão	Primeira Liga	5th place
Gil Vicente	Primeira Liga	6th place
Marítimo	Liga Portugal 2	1st place
Académico de Viseu	Liga Portugal 2	2nd place

== Quarter-finals ==
In this round, the higher-ranked teams played at home.

27 October 2026	Sporting CP	2–1	Marítimo	Lisbon
20:15 WET	Pedro Lima 44', 71'	Report	Butzke 90'	Stadium: Estádio de Alvalade; Attendance: 24,289; Referee: Iancu Vasilica

28 October 2026	Porto	1–0	Académico de Viseu	Porto
20:30 WET	Giménez 45' (pen.)	Report		Stadium: Estádio do Dragão; Attendance: 39,151; Referee: Sérgio Guelho

29 October 2026	Braga	2–2 (1–3 p)	Famalicão	Braga
18:45 WET	Horta 37' (pen.), 89' (pen.)	Report	Koutsias 16', 45+4' (pen.)	Stadium: Estádio Municipal de Braga; Attendance: 7,521; Referee: João Gonçalves
	Penalties
	Horta (penalty missed); Moutinho (penalty scored); Wind (penalty missed); Dorgeles (penalty missed)		(penalty missed) Dias; (penalty missed) Peña; (penalty scored) Sorriso; (penalty scored) Szűcs; (penalty scored) Moreira

29 October 2026	Benfica	4–1	Gil Vicente	Lisbon
20:45 WET	Lukébakio 36', 54'; Sudakov 41'; Durán 81'	Report	Lausen 56'	Stadium: Estádio da Luz; Attendance: 53,654; Referee: José Bessa

== Final-four ==
The final-four will be played from 5 to 9 January 2027 in Estádio Dr. Magalhães Pessoa, Leiria, and comprised the semi-finals and final of the competition.

=== Bracket ===
Semi-finals
5 January 2027 – Leiria
Porto
Benfica
6 January 2027 – Leiria
Sporting CP
Famalicão

Final
9 January 2027 – Leiria
Winner of Semi-final 1
Winner of Semi-final 2

=== Semi-finals ===
5 January 2027
20:15 WET

Porto	v	Benfica
	Report

Estádio Dr. Magalhães Pessoa, Leiria

6 January 2027
20:15 WET

Sporting CP	v	Famalicão
	Report

Estádio Dr. Magalhães Pessoa, Leiria

=== Final ===
9 January 2027
20:00 WET

Winner of Semi-final 1	v	Winner of Semi-final 2
	Report

Estádio Dr. Magalhães Pessoa, Leiria
