= Paulo Cardoso =

Cape Verdean footballer (born 2006)

Personal information
- Full name: Paulo Yanick Moreno Vieira Sanches Cardoso
- Date of birth: 3 July 2006 (age 20)
- Place of birth: Praia, Cape Verde
- Height: 1.71 m (5 ft 7 in)
- Position: Left winger

Team information
- Current team: Sporting CP B
- Number: 87

Youth career
- 2024: Sporting da Praia
- 2024–2025: Estrela da Amadora

Senior career*
Years	Team	Apps	(Gls)
2024	Estrela da Amadora C	1	(0)
2025	Estrela da Amadora B	2	(0)
2025–	Sporting CP B	33	(6)
2026–	Sporting CP	0	(0)
- * Club domestic league appearances and goals as of 15:39, 1 November 2026 (UTC)

Paulo Yanick Moreno Vieira Sanches Cardoso (born 3 July 2006), also known as Kanal, is a Cape Verdean professional footballer who plays for Portuguese club Sporting CP B as a left winger.

== Club career ==
Born in Praia, Cardoso was a youth player at Sporting da Praia before joining Estrela da Amadora. After scoring 14 goals in 24 games for the under-19 team, he transferred to Sporting CP on a five-year contract on 28 June 2025, and was assigned to the reserve team. He played 29 games in Liga Portugal 2 in 2025–26, scored five goals and assisted two; his first goal on 30 November opened a 3–1 home win over Farense.

Cardoso had his first call-up to the first team for a Taça da Liga quarter-final at home to Marítimo on 27 October 2026, with manager Rui Borges making several alterations. He made his debut in the 2–1 win, as a 73rd-minute substitute.

== International career ==
In May 2025, following his form for Estrela's under-19 team, Cardoso was monitored by the Cape Verdean Football Federation.
