= A.D. Ponte da Barca =

Portuguese association football club

Ponte da Barca
- Full name: Associação Desportiva de Ponte da Barca
- Nickname: Barquenses
- Short name: AD Ponte da Barca
- Founded: 1 March 1966; 60 years ago
- Ground: Estádio Municipal de Ponte da Barca
- Capacity: 1,227
- President: João David Araújo
- Head coach: Fernando Rego
- League: Campeonato de Portugal
- 2025–26: AF Viana do Castelo First Division, 1st (champions)
- Website: adpb.pt

Associação Desportiva de Ponte da Barca (Portuguese pronunciation: [ɐsɔsjɐˈsɐ̃w̃ dɨʃpɔɾˈtivɐ ðɨ ˈpõtɨ ðɐ ˈβaɾkɐ]), commonly known as AD Ponte da Barca or simply Ponte da Barca, is a Portuguese football club based in Ponte da Barca, Viana do Castelo District. It currently competes in the Campeonato de Portugal, the fourth tier of the Portuguese football league system.

Founded in 1966, Ponte da Barca has spent most of its history in regional competitions organised by the Viana do Castelo Football Association. The club won the association's First Division in the 2025–26 season, returning to national competition after more than a decade away. It subsequently won the 2026 AF Viana do Castelo Supertaça, defeating Atlético dos Arcos 3–2, completing a landmark season for the club. The achievements were recognised by the municipality of Ponte da Barca in July 2026.
