= Andreas Lausen =

Danish footballer

Personal information
- Full name: Andreas Sejr Lausen
- Date of birth: October 15, 2002 (age 24)
- Place of birth: Sønderborg, Denmark
- Height: 1.85 m (6 ft 1 in)
- Position: Midfielder

Team information
- Current team: Gil Vicente
- Number: 12

Youth career
- FC Sønderborg
- 2017–2021: Esbjerg fB

Senior career*
Years	Team	Apps	(Gls)
2021–2023	FC Fredericia	45	(5)
2023–2026	Esbjerg fB	96	(20)
2026–	Gil Vicente	1	(0)

International career
2019	Denmark U18	3	(0)
- * Club domestic league appearances and goals as of 20:04, 14 August 2026 (UTC)

Andreas Sejr Lausen (born 15 October 2002) is a Danish professional footballer who plays as a midfielder for Primeira Liga club Gil Vicente.

== Club career ==
Lausen is a product of the youth academies of the Danish clubs FC Sønderborg and Esbjerg fB. He began his senior career with FC Fredericia in the Danish 1st Division in 2021, before returning to Esbjerg fB in 2023. He helped Esbjerg fB win the 2023–24 Danish 2nd Division, and became a stalwart at the club. On 1 July 2026, Lausen transferred to Portuguese Primeira Liga club Gil Vicente.

== International career ==
Lausen was called up to the Denmark U18s for a set of friendlies in September 2019.

== Honours ==
Esbjerg fB

- Danish 2nd Division: 2023–24
