= Maia Lidador =

FC Maia Lidador
- Full name: Futebol Clube Maia Lidador
- Nickname: F.C. Maia Lidador
- Founded: 2009
- Ground: Dr. José Vieira de Carvalho, Maia, Portugal
- Capacity: 12,000
- Chairman: António Fernando Oliveira e Silva
- Head Coach: Márcio Paiva
- League: AF Porto – Liga Pro
- 2023-24: 3rd
- Website: fcmaialidador.pt
Home colours	Away colours

Maia Lidador is a Portuguese football club based in Maia, Porto Metropolitan Area. Founded in 2009, it is the successor of the now-extinct F.C. Maia, and until now, it has only played in regional divisions. The club holds home matches at the Estádio Municipal Dr. José Vieira de Carvalho, with a capacity for 12,000 spectators.

== History ==
F.C. Maia was definitively dissolved in 2011 due to financial problems, having played its last competitive senior season in 2008/09. In 2009, F.C. Maia Lidador was founded, honoring in its name Gonçalo Mendes da Maia «O Lidador», the greatest historical figure of the Maia municipality.

After F.C. Maia was excluded from III Divisão in 2008–09 due to serious financial problems, the new club made its debut in the 2009–10 season in the 2nd Division of the A.F. Porto. The team was promoted in its first year and spent the next three seasons in the second tier of district football before being promoted as champions of the 1st Division of the Porto Football Association in the 2012–13 season.

Since the 2013–14 season, F.C. Maia Lidador has competed in the top tier of district football in Porto, currently known as Hyundai Liga Pro due to sponsorship reasons. It is a regular top-five club, with ambitions to rise to the national championships.

== Recent seasons ==
Season	Level	Division	Section	Place	Movements
2018–19	Tier 4	A.F. Porto Pró-Nacional	Série 1	9th	
2019–20	Tier 4	A.F. Porto Pró-Nacional	Série 1	3rd	
2020–21	Tier 4	A.F. Porto Pró-Nacional	Série 1	3rd	
2021–22	Tier 5 (Note: The club moved to the fifth tier due to the reorganization of the national championships but remained in the top district division.)	A.F. Porto Pró-Nacional	Série 1	5th	
2022–23	Tier 5	A.F. Porto Pró-Nacional	Série 1	4th	
2023–24	Tier 5	A.F. Porto Pró-Nacional	Série 1	3rd	
