= Florgrade FC =

Portuguese football club

- League: Campeonato de Portugal

Florgrade Football Club is a Portuguese football club established in 2014 and headquartered in Ovar. It was founded and is owned by the Portuguese cork industry company with the same name (Florgrade). In the 2023–24 season, the football team was competing in the Campeonato de Portugal (D4) after earning promotion in the previous season.

== See also ==
- Works team

=== Palmares Titles ===
- (2) Aveiro Campeonato de Elite: 2022/23, 2024/25
- (1) AF Aveiro 1ª Divisão: 2020/21
