= U.D. Serra =

Portuguese football club

UD Serra
- Full name: União Desportiva da Serra
- Founded: 1976; 50 years ago
- Ground: Campo da Portela; Santa Catarina da Serra
- Capacity: 2,000
- Chairman: (Portugal) Felizberto Gonçalves
- Manager: (Portugal) Ricardo Moura
- League: Campeonato de Portugal
- 2021–22: Portuguese District Championships, promoted
Home colours	Away colours

União Desportiva da Serra is a Portuguese football club that competes in the fourth-tier Campeonato de Portugal. They were founded in 1976.

== History ==
The club was founded in 1976. On 18 August 2010, they played a friendly match against India and was beaten by 3–1.

== Appearances ==
- II Divisão: 3 (highest ranking: 7th)
- III Divisão: 2 (highest ranking: 2nd)
- AF Leiria: highest ranking: 1

== Honours ==
- AF Leiria – 1a Divisão:

== Brand and sponsor ==
- Legea (manufacturer brand), Lena Construções (sponsor)
