= Campeonato de Portugal (league) =

Football league in Portugal

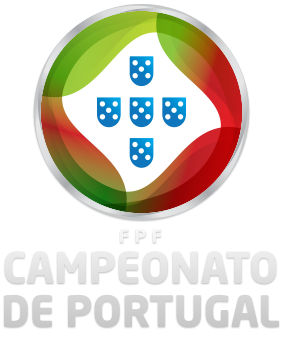
- Organising body: FPF
- Founded: 2013; 13 years ago
- Country: Portugal
- Confederation: UEFA
- Number of clubs: 56 (in 4 groups of 14)
- Level on pyramid: 3 (2013–2021); 4 (2021–present)
- Promotion to: Liga Portugal 2 (2013–2021); Liga 3 (2021–present)
- Relegation to: Portuguese District Championships
- Domestic cup: Taça de Portugal
- Current champions: Leça (1st title) (2025–26)
- Most championships: Mafra (2 titles)
- Broadcaster(s): Canal 11
- Website: fpf.pt
- Current: 2026–27 Campeonato de Portugal

The Campeonato de Portugal (Portuguese for "Championship of Portugal") is the fourth level of the Portuguese football league system. Together with the third-tier Liga 3, it is organized by the Portuguese Football Federation (FPF).

The Campeonato de Portugal was introduced in 2013 as the new third-level championship, under the name Campeonato Nacional de Seniores (Seniors National Championship), replacing the Segunda Divisão and Terceira Divisão (former third and fourth divisions, respectively). On 22 October 2015, it adopted its current naming. With the creation of the Liga 3 as the new third division from the 2021–22 season, the Campeonato de Portugal was demoted one level.

== Format ==
The 2026-27 season represents yet another reshuffle of Portuguese football system with changes incoming for the Cup and Campeonato de Portugal, the first event of this kind in the Pedro Proença presidency. According to the new regulations, the league is played by 56 clubs, the three relegated sides from Liga 3, 20 promoted teams from the district and regional championships (unless a club refuses, the local champion), and 32 teams that assured maintenance the prior season.

During the first phase, the teams are broken into four round-robin groups or «séries» of fourteen distributed geographically, of which the top two advance to the next phase. At the other end of the table, the bottom two are directly relegated to the district championships, while 11th and 12th face-off in four sets of maintenance/relegation play-offs over two matches (the series crossed A v B and C v D), with the higher-placed team having home advantage in the 2nd leg. The winners are safe, while the losers are relegated as well. As for the promotion phase (officially labelled 3rd phase), the format of two groups of four in which the teams are allocated into a northern and southern group depending on their location. As has been the case in the seasons before the format change, the two group winners are promoted and play for the trophy in the Championship Final at a neutral venue (unnamed but since 2018 in normal circumstances, Jamor); the two runners-up face-off in home and away access play-off which leads to a second tie of the same nature against the 16th-placed team of Liga Portugal 2; the remaining two assured of their continuity in the fourth-tier for the following season.

Up until the start of the 2026-27 season, twenty teams are promoted from the district leagues, in theory one from each, however, under the new format regulations the number of relegated teams is now only twelve. As of July 2026, it is unclear what this means for promotion the following season.

=== Historical formats ===
The first season, 2013–14, was contested by a total of 80 clubs, which included 19 teams from the District Championships, 39 from the Segunda Divisão, 19 from the Terceira Divisão and three teams relegated from the Segunda Liga during the 2012–13 season. In 2017–18, the format consisted of five series of eighteen teams, arranged according to geographic criteria, with the exception of teams from Madeira (placed in the first series) and from the Azores (placed in the last two series). The competition played with four groups of 18 teams in 2018–19 and the curtailed 2019–20 season. It has been played with eight groups of 12 in 2020–21, then it was reduced to five of 10 and one group of 11 teams in 2021–22 season.

== Seasons - league tables ==
Decade
2010s:	—			2013–14	2014–15	2015–16	2016–17	2017–18	2018–19	2019–20
2020s:	2020–21	2021–22	2022–23	2023–24	2024–25	2025–26	2026–27			

== List of champions and promoted teams ==
Season	Championship Final				Other promoted teams
Season	Champions	Score	Runners-up	Final venue	Other promoted teams
3rd tier
2013–14	Freamunde	3–2	Oriental	Estádio do Fontelo, Viseu	Vitória de Guimarães B
2014–15	Mafra	1–1 (a.e.t.), (4–3 p)	Famalicão	Estádio Municipal, Marinha Grande	Varzim
2015–16	Cova da Piedade	0–0 (a.e.t.), (2–0 p)	Vizela	Estádio Municipal, Abrantes	Fafe
2016–17	Real	2–0	Oliveirense	Estádio do Fontelo, Viseu	None
2017–18	Mafra	2–1	Farense	Estádio Nacional, Jamor	None
2018–19	Casa Pia	2–2 (a.e.t.), (4–2 p)	Vilafranquense	Estádio Nacional, Jamor	None
2019–20	Abandoned due to COVID-19 pandemic. (Note: Vizela and Arouca were promoted for being the two teams with the most points at the time of the suspension.)				Vizela and Arouca
2020–21	Trofense	1–0 (a.e.t.)	Estrela da Amadora	Estádio Cidade de Coimbra, Coimbra	None
4th tier
2021–22	Paredes	4–0	Fontinhas	Estádio Nacional, Jamor	Vilaverdense, Moncarapachense and Belenenses
2022–23	Atlético	3–0	Vianense	Estádio Nacional, Jamor	Lusitânia de Lourosa, 1º Dezembro and Pêro Pinheiro
2023–24	Amarante	3–0	Vitória de Setúbal (Note: Vitória de Setúbal were denied promotion due to for financial irregularities.)	Estádio Nacional, Jamor	São João de Ver, Lusitânia and União de Santarém
2024–25	Lusitano Évora	1–1 (a.e.t.), (3–1 p)	Vitória de Guimarães B	Estádio Nacional, Jamor	Paredes, Amora and Marco 09
2025–26	Leça	1–1 (a.e.t.), (5–4 p)	Vitória de Sernache	Estádio Nacional, Jamor	Vianense and Louletano

=== Performance by club ===
Club	Winners	Runners-up	Winning seasons	Runner-up seasons
Mafra	2	0	2014–15, 2017–18	–
Freamunde	1	0	2013–14	–
Cova da Piedade	1	0	2015–16	–
Real	1	0	2016–17	–
Casa Pia	1	0	2018–19	–
Trofense	1	0	2020–21	–
Paredes	1	0	2021–22	–
Atlético	1	0	2022–23	–
Amarante	1	0	2023–24	–
Lusitano Évora	1	0	2024–25	–
Leça	1	0	2025–26	–
Oriental	0	1	–	2013–14
Famalicão	0	1	–	2014–15
Vizela	0	1	–	2015–16
Oliveirense	0	1	–	2016–17
Farense	0	1	–	2017–18
Vilafranquense	0	1	–	2018–19
Estrela da Amadora	0	1	–	2020–21
Fontinhas	0	1	–	2021–22
Vianense	0	1	–	2022–23
Vitória de Setúbal	0	1	–	2023–24
Vitória de Guimarães B	0	1	–	2024–25
Vitória de Sernache	0	1	–	2025–26

Sporting positions
Preceded by Segunda Divisão	Third tier of Portuguese football 2013–2021	Succeeded by Liga 3
