= 2025–26 Premier League International Cup =

Tournament details
- Dates: 27 August 2025 – 12 May 2026
- Teams: 32 (from 10 associations)

Final positions
- Champions: (Germany) Borussia Dortmund (1st title)
- Runners-up: (Spain) Real Madrid

Tournament statistics
- Matches played: 71
- Goals scored: 231 (3.25 per match)
- Top scorer(s): (Germany) Taycan Etçibaşı (Borussia Dortmund) (5 goals)
- All statistics correct as of 29 April 2026.

The 2025–26 Premier League International Cup is the tenth season of the Premier League International Cup, a European club football competition organised by the Premier League for under-21 teams.

Nottingham Forest were the defending champions. Borussia Dortmund won the competition for the first time in their debut season in this tournament.

== Format ==
The competition features thirty-two teams: sixteen from English league system and sixteen invitees from other European countries. The teams are split into four groups of eight. The group winners and runners-up will progress into the knockout phase of the tournament.

All matches will be played in England.

=== Teams ===
English league system:

- (England) Brighton & Hove Albion
- (England) Chelsea
- (England) Crystal Palace
- (England) Everton
- (England) Fulham
- (England) Leeds United
- (England) Leicester City
- (England) Manchester City
- (England) Manchester United
- (England) Newcastle United
- (England) Nottingham Forest
- (England) Southampton
- (England) Sunderland
- (England) West Bromwich Albion
- (England) West Ham United
- (England) Wolverhampton Wanderers

Other countries:

- (Spain) Athletic Bilbao
- (Spain) Real Madrid
- (Spain) Real Sociedad
- (Spain) Valencia
- (Germany) Borussia Dortmund
- (Germany) Borussia Mönchengladbach
- (Germany) RB Leipzig
- (Portugal) Benfica
- (Portugal) Sporting CP
- (France) Monaco
- (France) Paris Saint-Germain
- (Italy) Juventus
- (Belgium) Anderlecht
- (Croatia) Dinamo Zagreb
- (Netherlands) PSV Eindhoven
- (Denmark) Nordsjælland

== Group stage ==
=== Group A ===
Pos	Team	Pld	W	D	L	GF	GA	GD	Pts
1	(England) Everton	4	3	0	1	10	6	+4	9
2	(Spain) Real Madrid	4	2	2	0	5	2	+3	8
3	(England) Wolverhampton Wanderers	4	2	1	1	6	3	+3	7
4	(France) Monaco	4	2	0	2	7	6	+1	6
5	(England) Manchester City	4	1	2	1	7	7	0	5
6	(Netherlands) PSV Eindhoven	4	1	1	2	7	8	−1	4
7	(Germany) RB Leipzig	4	1	1	2	6	9	−3	4
8	(England) Southampton	4	0	1	3	2	9	−7	1

Source: Premier League

10 September 2025	Wolverhampton Wanderers (England)	0–1	(Spain) Real Madrid	Wolverhampton
14:00 BST (UTC+1)		Report	Iglesias 84'	Stadium: Molineux Stadium; Attendance: 3,812; Referee: Jacob Viera

29 September 2025	Wolverhampton Wanderers (England)	1–1	(Germany) RB Leipzig	Telford
19:00 BST (UTC+1)	Chirewa 59'	Report	Ngatcheu 35'	Stadium: New Bucks Head; Referee: Declan Brown

28 October 2025	Wolverhampton Wanderers (England)	2–0	(Netherlands) PSV Eindhoven	Kidderminster
14:00 GMT (UTC±0)	González 32'; Ángel 35'	Report		Stadium: Aggborough Stadium; Referee: Kavan Hurn

29 October 2025	Southampton (England)	1–1	(Spain) Real Madrid	Southampton
19:00 GMT (UTC±0)	Okonola 90+4'	Report	Pitarch 76'	Stadium: St Mary's Stadium; Attendance: 10,907; Referee: Ross Martin

28 November 2025	Manchester City (England)	2–2	(Netherlands) PSV Eindhoven	Manchester
19:00 GMT (UTC±0)	Lawrence 34'; Heskey 90+4'	Report	Wint 45+1' (o.g.); Thomas 59'	Stadium: Joie Stadium; Referee: Zharir Mustafa

2 December 2025	Southampton (England)	0–2	(France) Monaco	Eastleigh
19:00 GMT (UTC±0)		Report	Brunner 16', 52'	Stadium: Silverlake Stadium; Referee: Daniel Baines

3 December 2025	Everton (England)	0–2	(Spain) Real Madrid	Liverpool
19:00 GMT (UTC±0)		Report	Fortuny 45+2', 90+6'	Stadium: Goodison Park; Attendance: 1,500; Referee: William Davis

15 December 2025	Everton (England)	3–2	(Netherlands) PSV Eindhoven	Liverpool
19:00 GMT (UTC±0)	Akarakiri 61'; Boakye 64'; Pita 79' (pen.)	Report	Jones 10'; van de Riet 52'	Stadium: Goodison Park; Referee: Oliver Mackey

16 December 2025	Manchester City (England)	1–1	(Spain) Real Madrid	Manchester
19:00 GMT (UTC±0)	Lawrence 28'	Report	Palacios 3'	Stadium: Joie Stadium; Referee: Will Finnie

19 December 2025	Everton (England)	2–1	(France) Monaco	Liverpool
19:00 GMT (UTC±0)	Tamen 45+2'; Morgan 90'	Report	Konaté 38'	Stadium: Goodison Park; Referee: Benjamin Speedie

14 January 2026	Manchester City (England)	3–1	(Germany) RB Leipzig	Manchester
19:00 GMT (UTC±0)	Mukasa 30', 34'; McAidoo 69'	Report	Konaté 66'	Stadium: Joie Stadium; Referee: Ben Robinson

20 January 2026	Manchester City (England)	1–3	(France) Monaco	Manchester
19:00 GMT (UTC±0)	McAidoo 90'	Report	Konaté 5', 54'; Sitou 45+6'	Stadium: Joie Stadium; Referee: Jacob Viera

20 January 2026	Everton (England)	5–1	(Germany) RB Leipzig	Liverpool
19:30 GMT (UTC±0)	Olayiwola 3'; Graham 13', 33'; Welch 86'; Loney 90'	Report	Voufack 21'	Stadium: Goodison Park; Referee: Grace Lowe

22 January 2026	Southampton (England)	1–3	(Netherlands) PSV Eindhoven	Eastleigh
19:00 GMT (UTC±0)	Akachukwu 82'	Report	van Duiven 18' (pen.), 70' (pen.); Sidibe 53'	Stadium: Silverlake Stadium; Referee: Abigail Byrne

3 February 2026	Southampton (England)	0–3	(Germany) RB Leipzig	Eastleigh
19:00 GMT (UTC±0)		Report	Ngatcheu 13' (pen.), 45+6', 66'	Stadium: Silverlake Stadium; Referee: Dan Baines
Note: Originally scheduled for 18 December 2025, but was postponed due to a waterlogged pitch.

10 February 2026	Wolverhampton Wanderers (England)	3–1	(France) Monaco	Kidderminster
19:00 GMT (UTC±0)	Reynolds 14'; Wilcox 18'; Ballard-Matthews 34'	Report	Dodo 80'	Stadium: Aggborough Stadium; Referee: Ben Speedie
Note: Match originally scheduled for 8 January 2026, but was abandoned in the 28th minute with Monaco 1–0 up, due to heavy snow.

=== Group B ===
Pos	Team	Pld	W	D	L	GF	GA	GD	Pts
1	(England) Crystal Palace	4	3	0	1	8	4	+4	9
2	(Spain) Valencia	4	3	0	1	8	5	+3	9
3	(Germany) Borussia Mönchengladbach	4	3	0	1	8	6	+2	9
4	(Denmark) Nordsjælland	4	2	1	1	8	5	+3	7
5	(England) Fulham	4	2	0	2	6	5	+1	6
6	(England) West Bromwich Albion	4	1	0	3	7	10	−3	3
7	(Italy) Juventus	4	1	0	3	5	11	−6	3
8	(England) Leicester City	4	0	1	3	6	10	−4	1

Source: Premier League

27 August 2025	Fulham (England)	3–2	(Spain) Valencia	New Malden
19:00 BST (UTC+1)	Olyott 31'; Gofford 65'; Ali Wahid 90+4'	Report	Domínguez 36', 76'	Stadium: Motspur Park; Referee: Harrison Blair

10 September 2025	Leicester City (England)	1–2	(Italy) Juventus	Seagrave
19:00 BST (UTC+1)	Pennant 56'	Report	Amaradio 55'; Pugno 62'	Stadium: Leicester City Training Ground; Attendance: 342; Referee: Kavan Hurn

23 September 2025	Leicester City (England)	1–3	(Spain) Valencia	Seagrave
19:00 BST (UTC+1)	Richards 49'	Report	Fernández 3'; Cerdá 45+1'; Okai 48'	Stadium: Leicester City Training Ground; Referee: Daniel Baines

30 September 2025	West Bromwich Albion (England)	0–3	(Denmark) Nordsjælland	West Bromwich
19:00 BST (UTC+1)		Report	Boe 13'; Jóhannesson 21'; Janssen 87' (pen.)	Stadium: The Hawthorns; Referee: Aaron Jackson

8 October 2025	West Bromwich Albion (England)	4–2	(Italy) Juventus	West Bromwich
19:00 BST (UTC+1)	Martinez 38' (o.g.); Bray 43', 52'; Parmar 90+7'	Report	Pugno 68'; Crapisto 90+6'	Stadium: The Hawthorns; Referee: Oliver Mackey

29 October 2025	West Bromwich Albion (England)	2–3	(Germany) Borussia Mönchengladbach	Perry Barr
19:00 GMT (UTC±0)	Francis-Caesar 37'; Mandey 86'	Report	Manco Danfa 40'; Herrmann 44'; Lieder 88' (pen.)	Stadium: Alexander Stadium; Referee: Jacob Viera

4 November 2025	Crystal Palace (England)	0–1	(Spain) Valencia	Sutton
19:00 GMT (UTC±0)		Report	Gamón 20'	Stadium: Gander Green Lane; Referee: Abigail Byrne

4 November 2025	Fulham (England)	0–1	(Denmark) Nordsjælland	New Malden
19:00 GMT (UTC±0)		Report	Nene 69'	Stadium: Motspur Park; Attendance: 96; Referee: Harrison Blair

4 November 2025	Leicester City (England)	2–3	(Germany) Borussia Mönchengladbach	Seagrave
19:00 GMT (UTC±0)	Gray 35'; Briggs 83' (pen.)	Report	Fleck 37', 39'; Mohya 54'	Stadium: Leicester City Training Ground; Referee: Joe Moss

12 November 2025	Crystal Palace (England)	3–1	(Italy) Juventus	Sutton
19:00 GMT (UTC±0)	Nascimento 12'; Williams 19'; Casey 40'	Report	Biggi 79'	Stadium: Gander Green Lane; Referee: Joe Moss

15 November 2025	Fulham (England)	3–0	(Italy) Juventus	New Malden
12:00 GMT (UTC±0)	Loupalo-Bi 11', 57'; Quashie 45+2'	Report		Stadium: Motspur Park; Referee: Paul Johnson

26 November 2025	Crystal Palace (England)	3–2	(Denmark) Nordsjælland	Sutton
19:00 GMT (UTC±0)	Reid 43', 64' (pen.); Casey 57'	Report	Dalsgaard 84'; Boe 90+2'	Stadium: Gander Green Lane; Referee: Oliver Mackey

3 December 2025	West Bromwich Albion (England)	1–2	(Spain) Valencia	Solihull
19:00 GMT (UTC±0)	Francis-Caeser 74'	Report	Domínguez 83'; Trigueros 90+2'	Stadium: Damson Park; Referee: Ben Robinson

9 December 2025	Fulham (England)	0–2	(Germany) Borussia Mönchengladbach	New Malden
19:00 GMT (UTC±0)		Report	Fleck 17'; Manco Danfa 90+9'	Stadium: Motspur Park; Referee: Daniel Baines

9 December 2025	Leicester City (England)	2–2	(Denmark) Nordsjælland	Seagrave
19:00 GMT (UTC±0)	Carr 64'; Otchere 73'	Report	Seidu 58'; Jóhannesson 90+4'	Stadium: Leicester City Training Ground; Referee: Jacob Viera

18 February 2026	Crystal Palace (England)	2–0	(Germany) Borussia Mönchengladbach	Sutton
19:00 GMT (UTC±0)	Reid 33' (pen.); Casey 39'	Report		Stadium: Gander Green Lane; Referee: Emily Heaslip
Note: Originally scheduled for 21 January 2026, but was postponed due to a waterlogged pitch.

=== Group C ===
Pos	Team	Pld	W	D	L	GF	GA	GD	Pts
1	(Spain) Real Sociedad	4	3	1	0	6	3	+3	10
2	(Croatia) Dinamo Zagreb	4	3	0	1	6	3	+3	9
3	(Portugal) Benfica	4	2	2	0	13	4	+9	8
4	(France) Paris Saint-Germain	4	2	1	1	7	5	+2	7
5	(England) Brighton & Hove Albion	4	1	2	1	6	5	+1	5
6	(England) Nottingham Forest	4	1	1	2	3	3	0	4
7	(England) Newcastle United	4	0	1	3	0	10	−10	1
8	(England) Chelsea	4	0	0	4	6	14	−8	0

Source: Premier League

13 September 2025	Nottingham Forest (England)	0–1	(Croatia) Dinamo Zagreb	West Bridgford
14:00 BST (UTC+1)		Report	Baković 37'	Stadium: City Ground; Referee: Callum Jones

18 October 2025	Chelsea (England)	1–2	(Croatia) Dinamo Zagreb	Kingston Upon Thames
14:00 BST (UTC+1)	Ampah 73'	Report	Ćutuk 85', 90+3'	Stadium: Kingsmeadow; Referee: Daniel Baines

18 November 2025	Newcastle United (England)	0–0	(Spain) Real Sociedad	Newcastle upon Tyne
19:00 GMT (UTC±0)		Report		Stadium: Whitley Park; Attendance: 126; Referee: Ben Robinson

21 November 2025	Newcastle United (England)	0–2	(France) Paris Saint-Germain	Newcastle upon Tyne
19:00 GMT (UTC±0)		Report	Ayari 27'; El Idrissi 31'	Stadium: Whitley Park; Attendance: 183 or 108; Referee: Zac Kennard-Kettle

21 November 2025	Brighton & Hove Albion (England)	1–1	(Portugal) Benfica	Lancing
19:30 GMT (UTC±0)	Oriola 32' (pen.)	Report	Pinto 79'	Stadium: American Express Elite Football Performance Centre; Referee: Aaron Jackson

3 December 2025	Chelsea (England)	1–3	(France) Paris Saint-Germain	Kingston Upon Thames
19:00 GMT (UTC±0)	Mheuka 75'	Report	Nsoki 52'; Housni 67', 76'	Stadium: Kingsmeadow; Attendance: 598; Referee: Tom Reeves

3 December 2025	Nottingham Forest (England)	1–1	(Portugal) Benfica	Mansfield
19:00 GMT (UTC±0)	Sinclair 12'	Report	Soares 37'	Stadium: Field Mill; Referee: Joe Moss

10 December 2025	Brighton & Hove Albion (England)	1–2	(Spain) Real Sociedad	Lancing
19:30 GMT (UTC±0)	Howell 54'	Report	Dadie 7'; Osazuwa 57'	Stadium: American Express Elite Football Performance Centre; Referee: Paul Howard

14 December 2025	Brighton & Hove Albion (England)	2–2	(France) Paris Saint-Germain	Lancing
16:00 GMT (UTC±0)	Oriola 90' (pen.); Shaw 90+6'	Report	Kamara 19' (pen.); Housni 83'	Stadium: American Express Elite Football Performance Centre; Referee: Tom Reeves

20 December 2025	Newcastle United (England)	0–3	(Croatia) Dinamo Zagreb	Newcastle upon Tyne
13:00 GMT (UTC±0)		Report	Bozhkov 2'; Šunta 50'; Horvat 59'	Stadium: Whitley Park; Referee: William Davis

7 January 2026	Chelsea (England)	2–6	(Portugal) Benfica	Stoke d'Abernon
19:00 GMT (UTC±0)	Ampah 50'; Derry 65'	Report	Coletta 9'; Moreira 24' (pen.); Parente 30'; Silva 45+3'; Bernardes 58'; Edokpolor 69'	Stadium: Cobham Training Centre; Referee: Grace Lowe

13 January 2026	Newcastle United (England)	0–5	(Portugal) Benfica	Newcastle upon Tyne
19:00 GMT (UTC±0)		Report	Tomé 10'; Barreiro 20'; Moreira 51', 85'; Silva 90+5'	Stadium: Whitley Park; Attendance: 44; Referee: Jacob Viera

19 January 2026	Nottingham Forest (England)	2–0	(France) Paris Saint-Germain	Loughborough
19:00 GMT (UTC±0)	Sinclair 8'; McClure 33'	Report		Stadium: Loughborough University; Attendance: 484; Referee: Harrison Blair

20 January 2026	Brighton & Hove Albion (England)	2–0	(Croatia) Dinamo Zagreb	Lancing
19:30 GMT (UTC±0)	Shaw 69'; Oriola 84'	Report		Stadium: American Express Elite Football Performance Centre; Referee: Ross Martin

21 January 2026	Chelsea (England)	2–3	(Spain) Real Sociedad	Kingston Upon Thames
19:00 GMT (UTC±0)	Kavuma-McQueen 49'; Ezenwata 64'	Report	Waite 69' (o.g.); Osagie 90+6' (o.g.); Mariezkurrena 90+7'	Stadium: Kingsmeadow

3 February 2026	Nottingham Forest (England)	0–1	(Spain) Real Sociedad	Burton upon Trent
19:00 GMT (UTC±0)		Report	Mariezkurrena 75'	Stadium: St George's Park; Referee: Zac Kennard-Kettle
Note: Match originally scheduled for 7 January 2026, was postponed due to a frozen pitch.

=== Group D ===
Pos	Team	Pld	W	D	L	GF	GA	GD	Pts
1	(Germany) Borussia Dortmund	4	3	0	1	8	4	+4	9
2	(England) Manchester United	4	3	0	1	8	7	+1	9
3	(England) Sunderland	4	2	1	1	11	6	+5	7
4	(Belgium) Anderlecht	4	2	1	1	9	4	+5	7
5	(England) Leeds United	4	2	0	2	4	7	−3	6
6	(Portugal) Sporting CP	4	1	0	3	5	7	−2	3
7	(Spain) Athletic Bilbao	4	1	0	3	6	11	−5	3
8	(England) West Ham United	4	1	0	3	3	8	−5	3

Source: Premier League

24 September 2025	Manchester United (England)	2–1	(Spain) Athletic Bilbao	Greater Manchester
19:00 BST (UTC+1)	Scanlon 68'; Galindo 90+4' (o.g.)	Report	Hierro 12'	Stadium: Old Trafford; Referee: Kavan Hurn

25 September 2025	Leeds United (England)	2–1	(Portugal) Sporting CP	York
14:00 BST (UTC+1)	Vincent 45+1'; Lopata-White 90'	Report	Momade 22'	Stadium: LNER Community Stadium; Attendance: 200; Referee: Ben Robinson

15 October 2025	Leeds United (England)	2–0	(Spain) Athletic Bilbao	York
14:00 BST (UTC+1)	Cresswell 57'; White 77'	Report		Stadium: LNER Community Stadium; Attendance: 90; Referee: Melissa Burgin

29 October 2025	Sunderland (England)	2–2	(Belgium) Anderlecht	Sunderland
19:00 GMT (UTC±0)	Brobbey 12'; Tutierov 80'	Report	Ntanda-Lukisa 5'; Bethume 32'	Stadium: Stadium of Light; Attendance: 800; Referee: Zac Kennard-Kettle

12 November 2025	Sunderland (England)	7–1	(Spain) Athletic Bilbao	Sunderland
19:00 GMT (UTC±0)	Waters 3', 45+1'; Jones 14'; Tutierov 25'; Neil 38'; Cirkin 58'; Middlemas 80'	Report	Vizcay 38'	Stadium: Stadium of Light; Referee: Kavan Hurn

20 November 2025	Sunderland (England)	1–0	(Portugal) Sporting CP	Sunderland
19:00 GMT (UTC±0)	Mundle 32'	Report		Stadium: Stadium of Light; Referee: William Davis

2 December 2025	Manchester United (England)	1–4	(Belgium) Anderlecht	Leigh
19:00 GMT (UTC±0)	Devaney 45'	Report	Sternal 48'; Van De Ven 57'; Özcan 63'; Ntanda-Lukisa 73'	Stadium: Leigh Sports Village; Referee: Jacob Viera

3 December 2025	West Ham United (England)	0–4	(Spain) Athletic Bilbao	Dagenham
19:00 GMT (UTC±0)		Report	de Luis 23'; Urzaiz 39'; Osipov 53'; Lozano 89'	Stadium: Victoria Road; Referee: Oliver Mackey

16 December 2025	Leeds United (England)	0–3	(Germany) Borussia Dortmund	York
19:00 GMT (UTC±0)		Report	Azhil 11'; Albert 33'; Etçibaşı 84'	Stadium: LNER Community Stadium; Referee: Melissa Burgin

17 December 2025	West Ham United (England)	1–2	(Portugal) Sporting CP	Dagenham
19:00 GMT (UTC±0)	Orford 18'	Report	Taibo 8'; Grombahi 45+3'	Stadium: Victoria Road; Referee: Abigail Byrne

19 December 2025	Manchester United (England)	2–0	(Germany) Borussia Dortmund	Greater Manchester
19:00 GMT (UTC±0)	Biancheri 7', 70'	Report		Stadium: Old Trafford; Attendance: 3,124; Referee: Callum Jones

13 January 2026	West Ham United (England)	1–2	(Germany) Borussia Dortmund	Dagenham
19:00 GMT (UTC±0)	Cummings 90'	Report	Inacio 39'; Etçibaşı 47'	Stadium: Victoria Road; Referee: Dan Baines

20 January 2026	Manchester United (England)	3–2	(Portugal) Sporting CP	Leigh
19:00 GMT (UTC±0)	Scanlon 8', 40', 76'	Report	Mota 11'; Peixoto 83'	Stadium: Leigh Sports Village; Referee: Aaron Jackson

21 January 2026	Sunderland (England)	1–3	(Germany) Borussia Dortmund	Sunderland
19:00 GMT (UTC±0)	Neill 82'	Report	Etçibaşı 23' (pen.); Albert 57'; Diallo 61'	Stadium: Stadium of Light; Attendance: 450; Referee: Elliot Bell

22 January 2026	Leeds United (England)	0–3	(Belgium) Anderlecht	York
19:00 GMT (UTC±0)		Report	Sternal 33', 46'; van de Ven 61'	Stadium: LNER Community Stadium; Referee: Zac Kennard-Kettle

11 February 2026	West Ham United (England)	1–0	(Belgium) Anderlecht	Dagenham
19:00 GMT (UTC±0)	Cummings 18'	Report		Stadium: Victoria Road; Referee: Grace Lowe
Note: Match originally scheduled to take place on 6 January 2026, was postponed due to a frozen pitch.

== Knockout stage ==
=== Quarter-finals ===
18 March 2026	Crystal Palace (England)	0–3	(Spain) Real Sociedad	Sutton
19:00 GMT		Report	Agote 45+1'; Nebreda 64'; Uriarte 78'	Stadium: Gander Green Lane

18 March 2026	Everton (England)	0–2	(Germany) Borussia Dortmund	Liverpool
19:00 GMT		Report	Reitz 57' (pen.); Kabar 90+3'	Stadium: Walton Hall Park; Referee: Zac Kennard-Kettle

7 April 2026	Manchester United (England)	2–4 (a.e.t.)	(Spain) Real Madrid	Greater Manchester
19:00 BST	Moorhouse 9'; Lacey 15' (pen.)	Report	Castrelo 45+1'; Iglesias 67'; Barroso 109'; Mesonero 118'	Stadium: Old Trafford; Attendance: 5,933; Referee: Ben Speedie

15 April 2026	Dinamo Zagreb (Croatia)	4–3 (a.e.t.)	(Spain) Valencia	Aldershot
19:00 BST	Perković 33'; Šunta 84'; Zebić 90+3'; Bozhkov 116'	Report	Martínez 20', 62'; El Aoud 70'	Stadium: Recreation Ground; Referee: Dan Baines

=== Semi-finals ===
28 April 2026	Dinamo Zagreb (Croatia)	1–2 (a.e.t.)	(Spain) Real Madrid	Woking
19:00 BST	Šunta 80' (pen.)	Report	Aguado 72'; Iglesias 94'	Stadium: Kingfield Stadium; Attendance: 1,125; Referee: Ross Martin

29 April 2026	Real Sociedad (Spain)	0–2	(Germany) Borussia Dortmund	Aldershot
19:00 BST		Report	Etçibaşı 68'; Diallo 90'	Stadium: Recreation Ground; Referee: Harrison Blair

=== Final ===
12 May 2026
19:00 BST

Real Madrid (Spain)	0–1	(Germany) Borussia Dortmund
	Report	Etçibaşı 7'

Adams Park, High Wycombe
Attendance: 2,014
Referee: (England) Oliver Mackey

Real Madrid	Borussia Dortmund

GK	25	(Spain) Sergio Mestre
RB	2	(Spain) David Jiménez		(substituted off) 71'
CB	4	(Spain) Mario Rivas		(substituted off) 81'
CB	23	(Spain) Lamini Fati	Booked
LB	5	(Spain) Manu Serrano
CM	8	(Spain) Manuel Ángel (c)
CM	14	(Spain) Jorge Cestero
RM	7	(Spain) Daniel Yáñez		(substituted off) 45'
AM	10	(Spain) César Palacios		(substituted off) 45'
LM	11	(Spain) Bruno Iglesias
CF	9	(Equatorial Guinea) Loren Zúñiga		(substituted off) 45'
Substitutes:
GK	13	(Spain) Guille Súnico
DF	3	(Spain) Víctor Valdepeñas		(substituted on) 71'
DF	17	(Spain) Jesús Fortea		(substituted on) 45'
DF	21	(Spain) Diego Aguado		(substituted on) 81'
DF	32	(Spain) Liberto Navascués		(substituted on) 45'
MF	42	(Spain) Cherif Fofana
FW	18	(Morocco) Rachad Fettal		(substituted on) 45'
Manager:
(Spain) Julián López

GK	1	(Germany) Aaron Held
RB	7	(Ukraine) Danylo Krevsun
CB	10	(Germany) Tony Reitz
CB	4	(Italy) Filippo Mané
LB	17	(Germany) Almugera Kabar	Booked
DM	19	(Morocco) Ayman Azhil
CM	23	(Luxembourg) Enzo Duarte		(substituted off) 67'
CM	20	(Germany) Tom Faust		(substituted off) 86'
RW	14	(Germany) Fadi Zarqelain		(substituted off) 78'
LW	11	(United States) Mathis Albert
CF	21	(Germany) Taycan Etcibasi		(substituted off) 78'
Substitutes:
GK	12	(Germany) Julian Froese
DF	5	(Algeria) Elias Benkara
DF	13	(Switzerland) Miguel Adje
MF	15	(Poland) Justin Hoy		(substituted on) 67'
MF	16	(Germany) Luke Fahrenhorst		(substituted on) 86'
MF	25	(Germany) Arne Wessels		(substituted on) 78'
FW	9	(Germany) Bennedikt Wüstenhagen		(substituted on) 78'
Manager:
(Germany) Felix Hirschnagl

Match rules

- 90 minutes
- 30 minutes of extra time if necessary
- Penalty shoot-out if scores still level
- Seven named substitutes
- Maximum of five substitutions, with a sixth allowed in extra time (Note: Each team was given only three opportunities to make substitutions, with a fourth opportunity in extra time, excluding substitutions made at half-time, before the start of extra time and at half-time in extra time.)

== Top goalscorers ==
Players with more than one goal displayed
There have been 231 goals scored in 71 matches, for an average of 3.25 goals per match (as of 13 May 2026).

5 goals

- (Germany) Taycan Etçibaşı (Borussia Dortmund)

4 goals

- (Germany) Yohan Ngatcheu (RB Leipzig)
- (Gibraltar) James Scanlon (Manchester United)

3 goals

- (England) Benjamin Casey (Crystal Palace)
- (Spain) Mario Domínguez (Valencia)
- (Germany) Fritz Fleck (Borussia Monchengladbach)
- (Morocco) Ilyes Housni (Paris Saint-Germain)
- (Spain) Bruno Iglesias (Real Madrid)
- (Ivory Coast) Oumar Konaté (Monaco)
- (Portugal) Gonçalo Moreira (Benfica)
- (England) Nehemiah Oriola (Brighton & Hove Albion)
- (Scotland) Dylan Reid (Crystal Palace)
- (France) Enzo Sternal (Anderlecht)
- (Slovenia) Sven Šunta (Dinamo Zagreb)

2 goals

- (United States) Mathis Albert (Borussia Dortmund)
- (England) Ato Ampah (Chelsea)
- (Wales) Gabriele Biancheri (Manchester United)
- (Denmark) Hjalte Boe (Nordsjaelland)
- (Bulgaria) Kaloyan Bozhkov (Dinamo Zagreb)
- (England) Jack Bray (West Bromwich Albion)
- (Germany) Paris Brunner (Monaco)
- (Scotland) Daniel Cummings (West Ham United)
- (Croatia) Mislav Ćutuk (Dinamo Zagreb)
- (Guinea-Bissau) Iaia Manco Danfa (Borussia Monchengladbach)
- (Spain) Ousmane Diallo (Borussia Dortmund)
- (Spain) Marc Martínez (Valencia)
- (Spain) Pol Fortuny (Real Madrid)
- (England) Jaiden Francis-Caeser (West Bromwich Albion)
- (Northern Ireland) Braiden Graham (Everton)
- (Iceland) Daniel Jóhannesson (Nordsjaelland)
- (Scotland) Emilio Lawrence (Manchester City)
- (England) Aaron Loupalo-Bi (Fulham)
- (Spain) Arkaitz Mariezkurrena (Real Sociedad)
- (England) Ryan McAidoo (Manchester City)
- (England) Divine Mukasa (Manchester City)
- (Democratic Republic of the Congo) Samuel Ntanda-Lukisa (Anderlecht)
- (Italy) Diego Pugno (Juventus)
- (England) Kofi Shaw (Brighton & Hove Albion)
- (Portugal) Francisco Silva (Benfica)
- (England) Jimmy Sinclair (Nottingham Forest)
- (Ukraine) Timur Tutierov (Sunderland)
- (Belgium) Terry Van De Ven (Anderlecht)
- (Netherlands) Robin van Duiven (PSV Eindhoven)
- (England) Jake Waters (Sunderland)
