= Sven Šunta =

Slovenian footballer (born 2007)

Personal information
- Date of birth: 7 May 2007 (age 19)
- Place of birth: Celje, Slovenia
- Position: Attacking midfielder

Team information
- Current team: Dinamo Zagreb
- Number: 41

Youth career
- NK Krško
- 2020–2025: Dinamo Zagreb

Senior career*
| Years | Team | Apps | (Gls) |
| 2025– | Dinamo Zagreb | 7 | (0) |

International career^{‡}
| 2022–2023 | Slovenia U16 | 3 | (1) |
| 2023–2024 | Slovenia U17 | 10 | (2) |
| 2025– | Slovenia U19 | 9 | (1) |
- * Club domestic league appearances and goals as of 14 August 2026 ‡ National team caps and goals as of 6 May 2026

Sven Šunta (born 7 May 2007) is a Slovenian professional footballer who plays as an attacking midfielder for Dinamo Zagreb.

== Club career ==
Born in Celje, Slovenia, Šunta played for the youth sector of NK Krško, before moving to the Dinamo Zagreb Academy in Croatia as a 13 years old.

In May 2023, he signed his first professional contract with Dinamo Zagreb.

Seen as one of the most promising prospect of the academy, he first stood out with the youth team, most notably during the 2025–26 Premier League International Cup, as the Croatians beat the likes of Chelsea, Newcastle, Nottingham Forest and Valencia, only losing to Real Madrid Castilla in a semi-final where Šunta scored a goal, his 6th decisive contribution of the competition.

Šunta made his professional debut with Dinamo Zagreb in a 4–0 Croatian Football League win over NK Varaždin on 22 February 2026, in a game where his compatriot Miha Zajc scored a brace. Coming on for his captain Josip Mišić in the last minutes of the game, Šunta managed to already deliver his first assist, for Marko Soldo's goal.

Following his debut, he started regularly featuring in Mario Kovačević's first team, as they went on to win the league, and signed a contract extension in April 2026.

== International career ==
Šunta is a youth international for Slovenia, having played for the under-16, under-17 and under-19.

== Career statistics ==
As of match played 14 August 2026

Appearances and goals by club, season and competition
| Club | Season | League | | | National cup | | Europe | | Other | | Total | |
| Club | Season | Division | Apps | Goals | Apps | Goals | Apps | Goals | Apps | Goals | Apps | Goals |
|---|---|---|---|---|---|---|---|---|---|---|---|---|
| Dinamo Zagreb | 2025–26 | Croatian Football League | 5 | 0 | 1 | 0 | 1 (Note: Appearances in UEFA Europa League) | 0 | — | | 7 | 0 |
| Dinamo Zagreb | 2026–27 | Croatian Football League | 2 | 0 | 0 | 0 | 0 | 0 | — | | 2 | 0 |
| Dinamo Zagreb | Total | | 7 | 0 | 1 | 0 | 1 | 0 | — | | 9 | 0 |
| Career total | | | 7 | 0 | 1 | 0 | 1 | 0 | 0 | 0 | 9 | 0 |

== Honours ==
Dinamo Zagreb

- HNL: 2025–26
