= Gabrijel Šivalec =

Croatian footballer

Personal information
- Date of birth: 5 May 2008 (age 18)
- Place of birth: Zabok, Croatia
- Height: 1.71 m (5 ft 7 in)
- Position: Winger

Team information
- Current team: Dinamo Zagreb II
- Number: 26

Youth career
- –2022: Zabok
- 2022–2025: Slaven Belupo

Senior career*
| Years | Team | Apps | (Gls) |
| 2025–2026 | Slaven Belupo | 18 | (0) |
| 2026– | Dinamo Zagreb | 0 | (0) |
| 2026– | Dinamo Zagreb II | 4 | (2) |

International career^{‡}
| 2025 | Croatia U17 | 3 | (1) |
| 2025 | Croatia U18 | 4 | (1) |
| 2026– | Croatia U19 | 3 | (0) |
- * Club domestic league appearances and goals as of 2 September 2026 ‡ National team caps and goals as of 2 September 2026

Gabrijel Šivalec (born 5 May 2008) is a Croatian professional footballer who plays as a winger for Croatian club Dinamo Zagreb II.

== Club career ==
Šivalec made his professional debut against Istra 1961, and then a few days later he scored his first professional goals, a brace, in a cup tie against Graničar Kotoriba.

== International career ==
Šivalec was called up for the 2025 FIFA U-17 World Cup representing the Croatia U17 team.

== Career statistics ==
As of match played 9 September 2026

Appearances and goals by club, season and competition
| Club | Season | League | | | Cup | | Europe | | Other | | Total | |
| Club | Season | Division | Apps | Goals | Apps | Goals | Apps | Goals | Apps | Goals | Apps | Goals |
|---|---|---|---|---|---|---|---|---|---|---|---|---|
| Slaven Belupo | 2025–26 | Croatian Football League | 18 | 0 | 3 | 2 | — | | — | | 21 | 2 |
| Dinamo Zagreb | 2026–27 | Croatian Football League | 0 | 0 | 1 | 0 | 0 | 0 | — | | 1 | 0 |
| Dinamo Zagreb II | 2026–27 | Croatian First League | 5 | 2 | — | | — | | — | | 5 | 2 |
| Career total | | | 23 | 2 | 4 | 2 | 0 | 0 | 0 | 0 | 27 | 4 |
