= Bruno Iglesias =

Spanish footballer (born 2003)

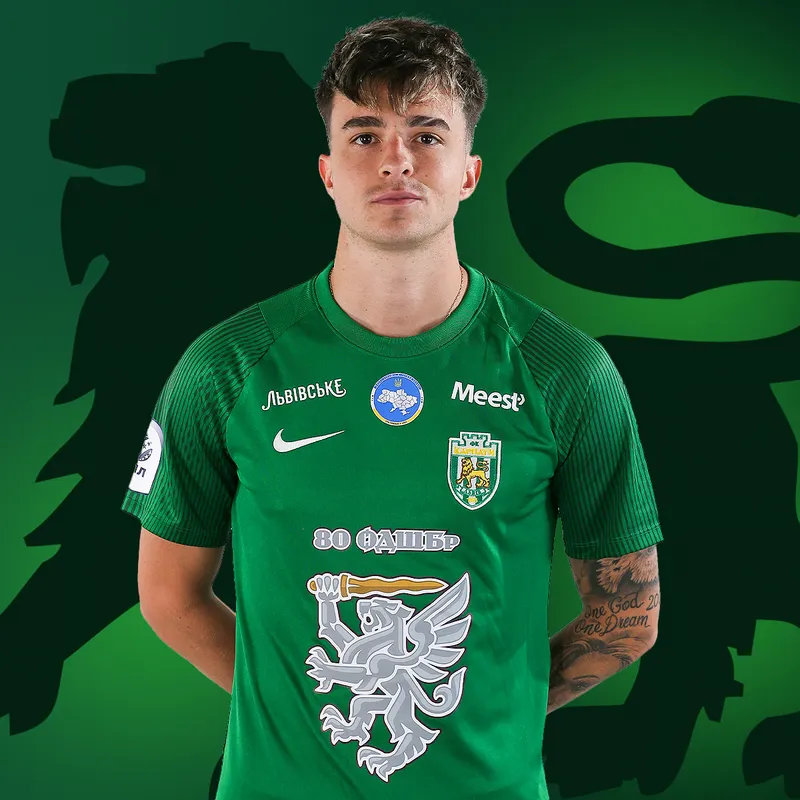

Personal information
- Full name: Bruno Iglesias Lois
- Date of birth: 1 May 2003 (age 23)
- Place of birth: Salamanca, Spain
- Height: 1.79 m (5 ft 10 in)
- Position: Midfielder

Team information
- Current team: Karpaty Lviv
- Number: 21

Youth career
- 2008–2015: Santa Marta
- 2015–2022: Real Madrid

Senior career*
Years	Team	Apps	(Gls)
2022–	Real Madrid B	18	(0)
2023	RSC Internacional	14	(5)
2023–2024	→ Celta Fortuna (loan)	26	(1)
2024–2025	Real Madrid C	25	(4)

International career^{‡}
2019	Spain U16	8	(1)
2019	Spain U17	5	(2)
2021	Spain U19	2	(0)
- * Club domestic league appearances and goals as of 30 November 2025 ‡ National team caps and goals as of 5 September 2021

Bruno Iglesias Lois (born 1 May 2003) is a Spanish footballer who plays as a midfielder for Ukrainian Premier League club Karpaty Lviv.

== Club career ==
=== Early career ===
Born in Salamanca, Spain, Iglesias played for local side Santa Marta between 2008 and 2015.

=== Real Madrid ===
After interest from Spanish sides Barcelona and Atlético Madrid, as well as English side Manchester City, Iglesias joined Real Madrid in 2015. He progressed through the youth ranks at Los Blancos, and has occasionally trained with the first team since 2019.

In October 2020, Iglesias was named among the 60 best young talents in the world by English newspaper The Guardian, and is considered one of the top youth prospects in the Real Madrid academy.

In 2021, Iglesias signed a two-year contract extension.

In 2022, Iglesias was promoted to reserves team in Primera Federación, but in January 2023, Iglesias was demoted to Real Madrid's unofficial farm team, RSC Internacional in fifth division.

On 21 July 2023, Iglesias moved to Primera Federación side Celta Fortuna on loan for the season.

Upon returning in July 2024, Iglesias was assigned to Real Madrid's second reserve team, Real Madrid C, in Segunda Federación for the season.

In 2025, Iglesias was promoted again with Real Madrid Castilla for the season, since his last appearance in 2022.

== International career ==
Iglesias has represented Spain at the under-16, under-17, and under-19 levels.

== Personal life ==
In 2020, Iglesias became a member of fellow Spaniard Juan Mata's charity, Common Goal, and pledged to donate 1% of his wage to the COVID-19 Response Fund. He is the youngest member of the charity.

== Career statistics ==
=== Club ===
As of 15 November 2025

Appearances and goals by club, season and competition
Club	Season	League			Other		Total	
Club	Season	Division	Apps	Goals	Apps	Goals	Apps	Goals
Real Madrid B	2022–23	Primera Federación	5	0	–		5	0
RSC Internacional	2022–23	Tercera Federación	14	5	4 (Note: Appearances in 2023 Tercera Federación play-offs)	0	18	5
Celta Fortuna (loan)	2023–24	Primera Federación	26	1	1 (Note: Appearance in 2024 Primera Federación play-offs)	0	27	1
Real Madrid C	2024–25	Segunda Federación	25	4	2 (Note: Appearances in 2025 Segunda Federación play-offs)	1	27	5
Real Madrid B	2024–25	Primera Federación	1	0	–		1	0
Real Madrid B	2025–26	Primera Federación	12	0	0	0	12	0
Real Madrid B	Total		13	0	0	0	13	0
Career total			83	10	7	1	90	11

== Honours ==
Real Madrid Juvenil A

- UEFA Youth League: 2019–20
