= Austyn Jones =

Dutch footballer (born 2008)

Personal information
- Date of birth: 16 April 2008 (age 18)
- Place of birth: Netherlands
- Position: Forward

Team information
- Current team: Jong PSV
- Number: 9

Youth career
- –2023: FC Utrecht
- 2023–: PSV Eindhoven

Senior career*
Years	Team	Apps	(Gls)
2025–	Jong PSV	3	(0)

International career
2023	Netherlands U15	2	(0)
2023–2024	Netherlands U16	8	(4)
- * Club domestic league appearances and goals

Austyn Jones (born 16 April 2008) is a Dutch professional footballer who plays as a forward for Jong PSV.

== Early life ==
Jones was born on 16 April 2008 in Utrecht, Netherlands.

== Club career ==
As a youth player, Jones joined the youth academy of Dutch side FC Utrecht. Following his stint there, he joined the youth academy of Dutch side PSV Eindhoven ahead of the 2023–24 season and was promoted to the club's senior team in 2025.

== International career ==
Jones is a Netherlands youth international and has been called up to represent the United States internationally at youth level. On 4 October 2023, he debuted for the Netherlands national under-16 football team during a 1–2 home friendly loss to the Italy national under-16 football team.
