= Hjalte Boe =

Danish footballer (born 2007)

Personal information
- Full name: Hjalte Boe Kling Rasmussen
- Date of birth: 15 October 2007 (age 19)
- Place of birth: Faldsled, Denmark
- Height: 1.81 m (5 ft 11 in)
- Position: Right winger

Team information
- Current team: Nordsjælland
- Number: 40

Youth career
- Faldsled Svanninge FS
- Svendborg fB
- 2021–2025: OB

Senior career*
Years	Team	Apps	(Gls)
2025–	Nordsjælland	24	(3)

International career^{‡}
2024–2025	Denmark U18	5	(1)
2025–2026	Denmark U19	10	(3)
2026–	Denmark U20	2	(0)
- * Club domestic league appearances and goals as of 18 October 2026 ‡ National team caps and goals as of 16:03, 4 October 2026 (UTC)

Hjalte Boe Kling Rasmussen (born 15 October 2007), also known as just Hjalte Boe, is a Danish footballer who plays as a right winger for Danish Superliga club FC Nordsjælland.

== Club career ==
=== Early career ===
Born and raied in Faldsled, a small harbour town on Funen, Boe started playing football at the local club, Faldsled Svanninge FS, at the age of three. He later joined Svendborg fB at the age of 11, before moving to OB, where he joined the clubs U15 team.

In October 2022, when Boe turned 15, he signed his first youth contract with OB. A year later, in September 2023, he extended his contract with OB until June 2025.

=== FC Nordsjælland ===
On February 3, 2025, just under five months before his contract expiry at OB, it was confirmed that Boe had been sold to FC Nordsjælland, where he initially became part of the club's U-19 squad. The transfer made Boe the most expensive academy player ever traded between two Danish clubs, as Boe, according to the media, was sold for 5 million kroner.

On August 3, 2025, Boe made his official debut for FC Nordsjælland when he replaced Prince Amoako Jr. in the 80th minute in a 2–3 defeat to Sønderjyske.

== Career statistics ==
As of match played 18 October 2026

Appearances and goals by club, season and competition
Club	Season	League			Cup		Europe		Total	
Club	Season	Division	Apps	Goals	Apps	Goals	Apps	Goals	Apps	Goals
Nordsjælland	2025–26	Danish Superliga	13	0	1	0	—		14	0
Nordsjælland	2026–27	Danish Superliga	11	3	1	1	5 (Note: Appearances in UEFA Conference League)	3	17	7
Career total			24	3	2	1	5	3	31	7
