= Lamini Fati =

Spanish footballer (born 2006)

Personal information
- Full name: Lamini Domingos Fati João
- Date of birth: 18 April 2006 (age 20)
- Place of birth: Madrid, Spain
- Height: 1.80 m (5 ft 11 in)
- Position: Centre-back

Team information
- Current team: Real Madrid B
- Number: 23

Youth career
- 2013–2019: Unión Adarve
- 2019–2024: Leganés
- 2025: Real Madrid

Senior career*
Years	Team	Apps	(Gls)
2024	Leganés B	12	(1)
2025–	Real Madrid B	24	(0)
- * Club domestic league appearances and goals as of 8 September 2026

Lamini Domingos Fati João (born 18 April 2006) is a Spanish footballer who plays as a centre-back for Real Madrid Castilla.

== Early life ==
Fati was born on 18 April 2006 in Madrid, Spain.

== Club career ==
As a youth player, Fati joined the youth academy of Unión Adarve. Subsequently, he joined the youth academy of Leganés and was promoted to the club's reserve team in 2024.

In 2025, he joined the youth academy of La Liga side Real Madrid. Spanish newspaper Marca wrote in 2025 that he became "a fixture in the manager's lineup and has become a key player in the Real Madrid youth team" while playing for the club.

== Style of play ==
Fati plays as a defender. Left-footed, he is known for his strength and technical versatility.
