= GNK Dinamo Zagreb =

Croatian association football club

Dinamo Zagreb
- Full name: Građanski nogometni klub Dinamo Zagreb (Citizens’ football club Dinamo Zagreb)
- Nicknames: Modri, Plavi ('The Blues'); Purgeri ('The Citizens')
- Short name: Dinamo, DZG
- Founded: 26 April 1911; 115 years ago (as 1. HŠK Građanski); 9 June 1945; 81 years ago (as FD Dinamo)
- Ground: Stadion Maksimir
- Capacity: 24,851
- President: Zvonimir Boban
- Manager: Jerko Leko
- League: Croatian Football League
- 2025–26: Croatian Football League, 1st of 10 (champions)
- Website: gnkdinamo.hr
Home colours	Away colours	Third colours

Građanski nogometni klub Dinamo Zagreb (lit. 'Citizens' football club Dinamo Zagreb'), commonly referred to as Dinamo Zagreb (pronounced [dǐnamo zâːɡreb]), is a Croatian professional football club based in Zagreb. They compete in the Croatian Football League (HNL), the top tier of Croatian football. They are the most successful club in Croatian football, having won twenty-six league titles, eighteen Croatian Cups, еight Croatian Super Cups, and one Inter-Cities Fairs Cup. The club has spent its entire existence in top flight, having been members of the Yugoslav First League from 1946 to 1991 and Prva HNL from 1992.

They entered the Yugoslav First League in its inaugural 1946–47 season, finishing as runners-up. In their second season in Yugoslav top flight in 1947–48 they finished as Yugoslav champions, which was their first major trophy. The club won three more league titles and seven Yugoslav Cups. Upon the independence of Croatia, the club joined the Croatian football league system in 1991. Dinamo are, to date, the only Croatian club to win a European trophy, having won the 1966–67 Inter-Cities Fairs Cup by defeating Leeds United in the final. They also finished runners-up in the same competition in 1963 when they lost to Valencia.

The club was known as HAŠK Građanski from 1991 to 1993 and Croatia Zagreb from 1994 to 2000. They won five league titles and participated in the 1998–99 and 1999–2000 UEFA Champions League group stages carrying that name. The team's traditional colour is royal blue, which has been replaced for European matches in recent times with the darker navy blue. The club's biggest rivals are Hajduk Split, jointly contesting the "Eternal Derby". Their youth academy, Dinamo Zagreb Academy, is the club's primary development program.

== History ==
=== Foundation of Građanski (1911–45) ===
In 1911, when Croatia was still part of the Austro-Hungarian Empire, Građanski was founded in Zagreb by Andrija Mutafelija and a few of his friends in response to rumors that a football club that was meant to play in the Hungarian football league (as opposed to the Croatian Sports Union) was about to be established. Građanski was therefore founded as a multi-sports club with a distinctly Croatian identity intended to cater to citizens of Zagreb, with sections dedicated to football, handball and cycling. At first they used grounds in Zagreb's neighbourhoods of Tuškanac, Martinovka, Kanal and Maksimir, until they built their own stadium at Koturaška street, which was officially opened in 1924 by Stjepan Radić, a prominent Croatian politician.

Internationally, the club went on several successful tours – on one of these, in 1923 in Spain, Građanski beat Barcelona and Athletic Bilbao. The club often toured to Austria and Hungary and played friendly matches with top local sides. In 1936, they went on tour to England where they adopted the WM formation which helped them win the 1936–1937 Yugoslav championship. Márton Bukovi, who started using the formation as Građanski manager in 1936, introduced it to Hungary in the late 1940s and later modified it into the now famous WW system which brought the Hungary national team to the final game of the 1954 World Cup.

The club competed in the Mitropa Cup, the first European international club competition, on three occasions – in 1928, 1937 and 1940. In 1928, Građanski were knocked out in the two-legged quarterfinal by Viktoria Žižkov of Czechoslovakia with 4–8 on aggregate. Nine years later, Građanski exited early again after suffering a 1–6 aggregate loss to Genova 1893 FBC. In 1940, they beat the Hungarian side Újpest FC (5–0 on aggregate) in the quarterfinal, only to be defeated by Rapid Bucharest in the semifinal. Both legs ended without goals, so a playoff game in Subotica was held, which ended 1–1. Rapid progressed to the final on a coin toss, but the final game (against Ferencváros) was never played because of the outbreak of World War II.

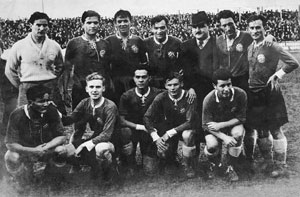
Građanski team 1937.

Having been invaded and occupied by the Nazi Germany in 1941, the Kingdom of Yugoslavia was dissolved and sports competitions in the nation were suspended. An exception to this was the Independent State of Croatia (NDH) which, as an Axis member, enjoyed peace and so the NDH continued to hold national competitions featuring prominent Croatian clubs. Four of these seasons were started (1941, 1941–42, 1942–43 and 1943–44) but only the second and third editions were finished, with Građanski winning the 1942–43 season.

When the war ended in 1945, the club was disbanded by the new communist government (along with city rivals HAŠK and Concordia Zagreb) and its archives were destroyed in retribution for competing in the wartime football league. The club's last official game was a 2–2 draw against HAŠK on 10 April 1945, just before both clubs were disbanded.

=== Dissolution of Građanski and establishment of Dinamo (1945–66) ===
In the immediate aftermath of World War II, Građanski was disbanded (along with city rivals HAŠK and Concordia Zagreb) by a decree issued by the communist authorities in June 1945. On 9 June 1945, just three days after Građanski was disbanded, a new sports society called FD Dinamo (Croatian: Fiskulturno društvo Dinamo) was founded. Soon after the initial meeting, the football section was formed with Ico Hitrec as the chairman, and some old players and administration members of Građanski (Jerko Šimić, Rudolf Sabljak, Otto Hofman, Franjo Staroveški, Slavko Bobnar, Zvonimir Stanković) becoming administration members of the club of which some of them later became presidents. The newly established Dinamo took over Građanski's colors and nickname, inherited its pre-war fan base, and in 1969 even adopted a badge strongly resembling Građanski's. Many Građanski's most notable players continued their career at Dinamo upon its formation (including Franjo Wölfl, August Lešnik, Zvonimir Cimermančić, Branko Pleše, Milan Antolković, Mirko Kokotović, Ivica Reiss, Emil Urch and later Ivan Jazbinšek) as well as their coach Márton Bukovi, physiotherapist Franjo Žlof and a significant number of juniors. First generation of Dinamo's youth team was coached by Građanski's former goalkeeper Maks Mihelčić who also took the role of a goalkeeping coach. In the first few years, the club played their home matches at Građanski's old ground, Stadion Koturaška, before moving to a new stadium built on place of HAŠK's former ground in Maksimir.

Following its formation, the club entered Yugoslav First League in its inaugural 1946–47 season and finished runners-up, five points behind champions Partizan. In the following 1947–48 season, Dinamo won their first trophy after winning the Yugoslav championship with five points ahead of Hajduk Split and Partizan. In the 1951 season, the club finished runners-up again, but compensated with their first Yugoslav Cup title after defeating Vojvodina 4–0 in the two–legged final. Dinamo later added three more cup titles (in 1960, 1963 and 1965) and two championship wins (in 1953–54 and 1957–58). In addition, they were also cup runners–up on three occasions (in 1950, 1964 and 1966). Dinamo first entered European competitions in the preliminary round of the 1958–59 European Cup, but were knocked out by the Czechoslovak side Dukla Prague. The club then had some success in the 1960–61 European Cup Winners' Cup, as they managed to reach the semi-finals where they lost to Italian side Fiorentina. They have also competed in the 1961–62 Inter-Cities Fairs Cup, but failed to progress beyond the second round in which they were knocked out by Barcelona. However, in the 1962–63 Inter-Cities Fairs Cup, Dinamo managed to reach the final, but lost 4–1 on aggregate to Spanish side Valencia. In the 1963–64 European Cup Winners' Cup, they made an early exit in the first round after a defeat to Scottish side Celtic. During this period, many of Dinamo's star players were also integral part of the Yugoslavia national team, including Željko Čajkovski, Zlatko Škorić, Krasnodar Rora, Denijal Pirić, Dražan Jerković, Ivica Horvat, Slaven Zambata and Rudolf Belin.

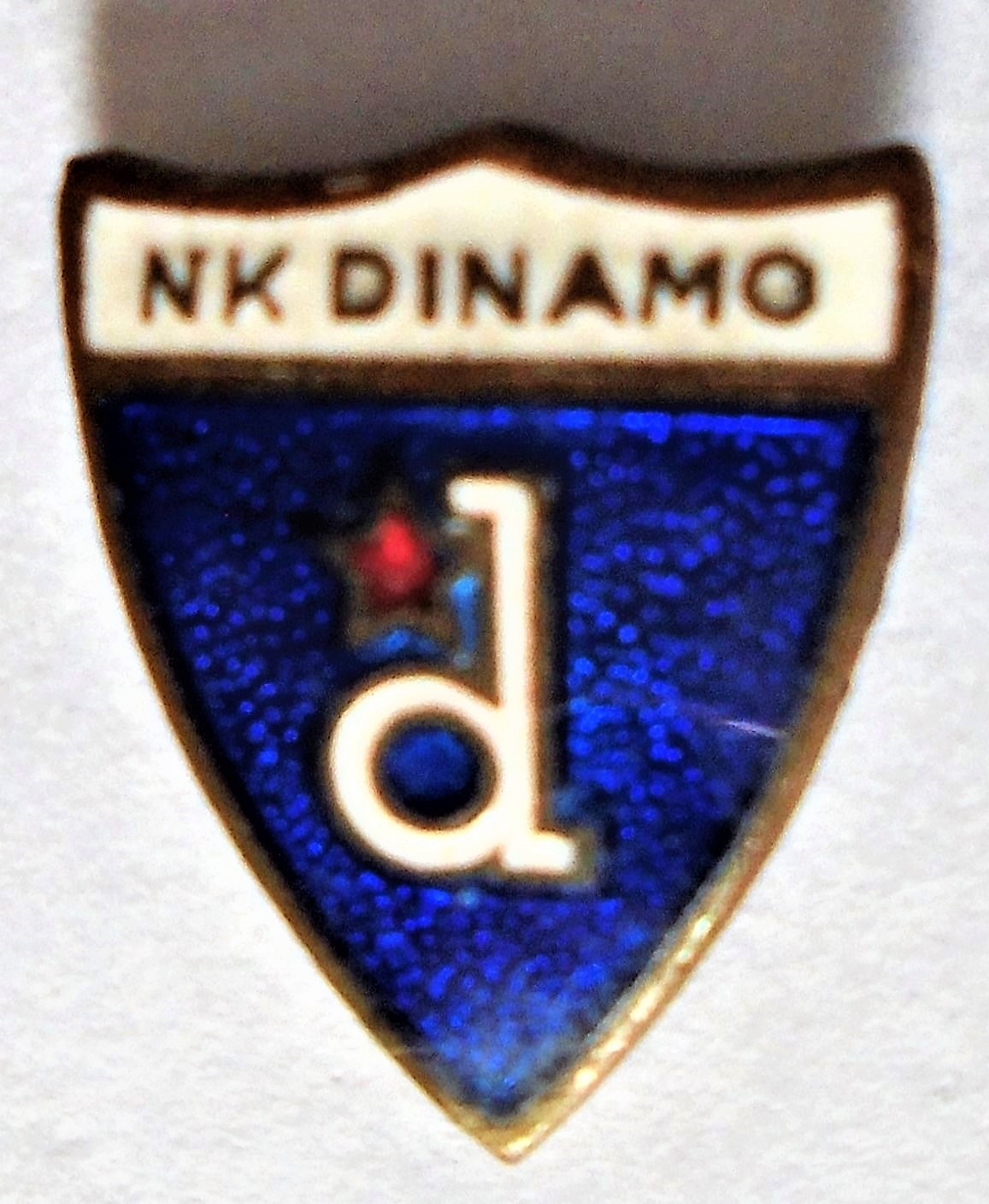
Old enamel badge of the club during communist Yugoslavia

=== Inter-Cities Fairs Cup (1966–67) ===
Three Yugoslav clubs went on to participate in the 1966–67 Inter-Cities Fairs Cup, but they were knocked–out early in the competition, excluding Dinamo, who went on to become the first ever Yugoslavia team that won a European competition. In the first round, Dinamo played against Spartak Brno and after the aggregate score was level at 2–2, a coin was flipped in order to determine the winner. Dinamo was through to the second round, where they were drawn against Scottish side Dunfermline. For the first time in the history of the Cup, the away goals rule were introduced, which helped Dinamo qualify for the third round after the aggregate score was 4–4 (2–0 at home and 2–4 away). On their road to finals, they defeated Romanian side Dinamo Piteşti, Italian powerhouse Juventus and German side Eintracht Frankfurt. In the finals the club was drawn to play its first match at Maksimir against Leeds United. Dinamo won 2–0 in front of the 33 thousand fans with Marijan Čerček and Krasnodar Rora scoring, which was enough to secure the title as the match at Elland Road finished 0–0. The final matches were attended by the then president of FIFA, Sir Stanley Rous, who handed the trophy to Dinamo's captain and top goalscorer Slaven Zambata.

=== Post–European success era (1967–91) ===
Dinamo closed the successful 1960s with Yugoslav Cup title in the 1969 and quarterfinals of the 1969–70 Cup Winners' Cup competition. Unfortunately, the success did not follow the club to the new decade, as they failed to win a single trophy throughout the 1970s. The club participated in three more seasons of Inter-Cities Fairs Cup before it was replaced with the UEFA Cup, but failed to make any impact. Dinamo took part of the initial UEFA Cup season, but lost in the second round of the competition to Rapid Wien on the away goals rule. The club entered the UEFA Cup on seven more occasions (in 1976, 1977, 1979, 1988, 1989, 1990 and 1992), but never repeated its success from the '60s.

The 1978–79 Yugoslav Championship both Hajduk Split and Dinamo Zagreb finished the season on 50 points, but Hajduk won the championship having the better goal difference. However, there was a controversy in the first round when Rijeka defeated Dinamo 2–1 at Kantrida. Dinamo claimed that Edmond Tomić, who joined Rijeka that season from Lirija, didn't serve a one-match suspension following two yellow cards received while playing for his former club. They appealed and after two months it has been decided to award the match 3–0 to Dinamo. After several appeals from both sides, in spring 1979 Football Association of Yugoslavia ruled in favour of Rijeka. The case was brought to Employment Appeal Tribunal, which four years later ruled Dinamo as champions.[1] The injustice was never corrected as Dinamo never received recognition from Football Association of Yugoslavia nor Hajduk who simply ignored the judgement. This is still often seen by Dinamo's fans as another evidence of mistreatment of their club by Yugoslav football authorities and as hypocrisy of their rivals - Hajduk.

Finally, at the beginning of the 1980s, Dinamo won their sixth Yugoslav Cup title, defeating Red Star Belgrade 2–1 on aggregate. They then qualified for the 1980–81 Cup Winners' Cup but lost in the first round to Benfica. In 1982, Dinamo sealed their fourth Yugoslav championship and in 1983 won their seventh Yugoslav Cup, the club's last trophy as a part of the SFR Yugoslavia. After Benfica, another Portuguese club sealed Dinamo's European season, this time in 1982–83 European Cup when they lost to Sporting CP. They played in 1983–84 Cup Winners' Cup season and were eliminated, again, by Portuguese side Porto. The club did not have any success in the second part of the 1980s, save for two consecutive second-place finishes in the Yugoslav championship in 1989 and 1990.

=== Croatia Zagreb era (1991–2000) ===
After the SFR Yugoslavia was dissolved, Dinamo took part in creating the Prva HNL and the initial season was played in 1992. The same year, the club controversially changed its name to HAŠK Građanski, and another name change followed in 1993, when the club was renamed to Croatia Zagreb. The name change was widely seen as a political move by the leadership of then newly independent Croatia, with the goal of distancing the club from its communist past. As the name change was also never accepted by their supporters, the club renamed themselves back to Dinamo on 14 February 2000. As Croatia Zagreb, the club won six league titles, of which five were won in a row from 1996 to 2000. During this period, the club also won the Croatian Cup four times.

In the late 1990s, the club played two consecutive seasons in the UEFA Champions League group stage. In the 1998–99 season, they were drawn in a group with Ajax, Olympiacos and Porto. After disappointing performances in the first three matches, in which they managed to draw against Ajax at home and lost their away matches against Olympiacos and Porto, they performed well in the remaining three matches, beating Porto at home and Ajax away, as well as drawing Olympiacos at home. However, they failed to advance to the quarter-finals as the second-placed team behind Olympiacos. In the 1999–2000 season, they were drawn in a group with defending champions Manchester United, Marseille and Sturm Graz, but managed only a fourth-place finish in the group with two draws and one win. They most notably held Manchester United to a goalless draw at Old Trafford in their opening Champions League match that season. The club also competed in two consecutive seasons of UEFA Cup—in 1996, they were knocked out in the qualifying round, while in the 1997, they managed to reach the third round, losing to Atlético Madrid 2–1 on aggregate score.

=== Dinamo Zagreb era (2000–present) ===
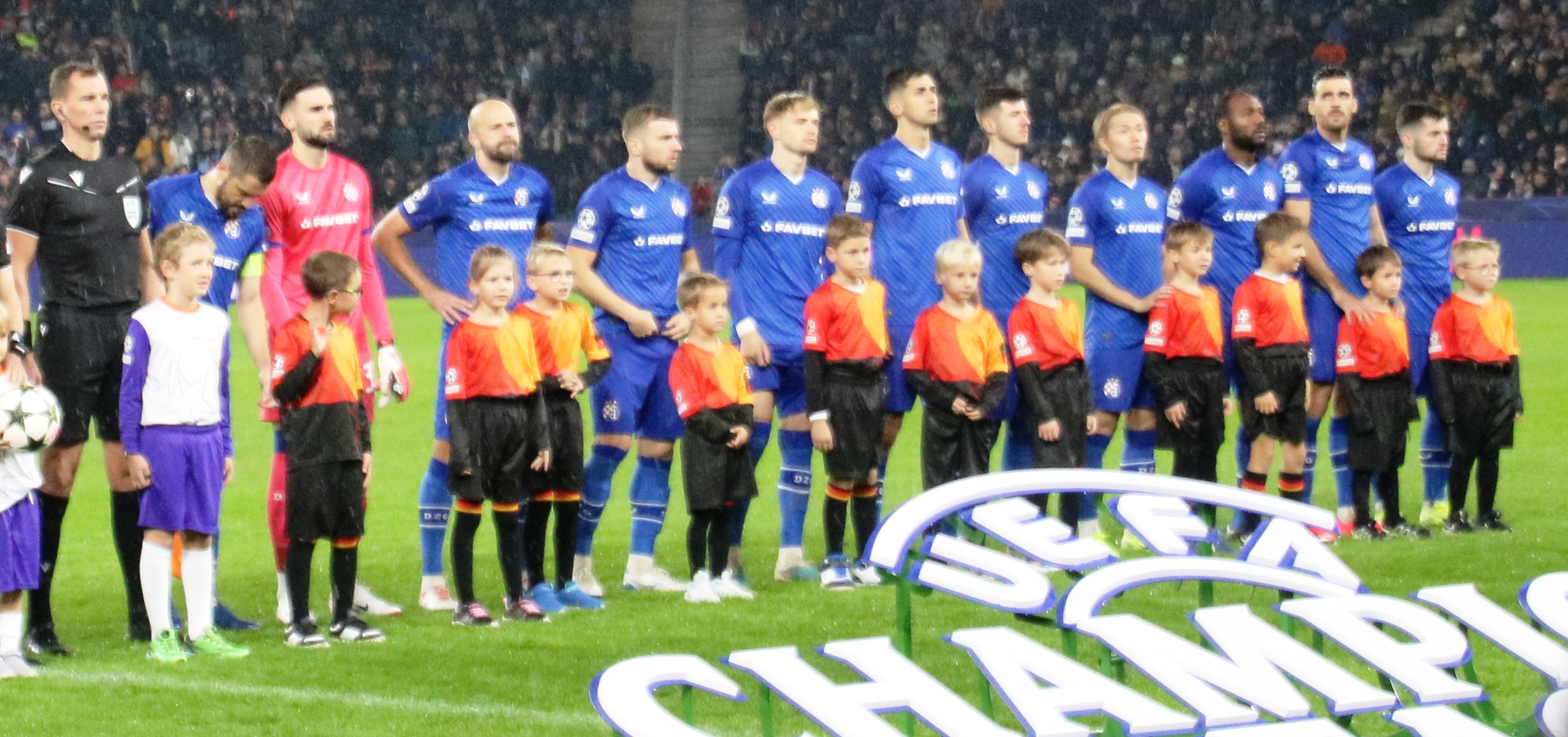
Dinamo Zagreb in 2024

==== "Golden Era" (2000–15) ====
The club subsequently participated five times in the third qualifying round of the Champions League, in 2000, 2003, 2006, 2007 and 2008. However, they played against Milan, Dynamo Kyiv, Arsenal, Werder Bremen, Shakhtar Donetsk and failed to win a single match, losing 6–1 on aggregate to Milan, 5–1 on aggregate to Dynamo Kyiv, Shakhtar Donetsk and Arsenal and 5–3 on aggregate to Werder Bremen. Since the qualifying rounds format changed, Dinamo was unable to get through to the play-off round, losing 3–2 on aggregate to Red Bull Salzburg in 2009. Before the UEFA Cup group stage phase was introduced, Dinamo's best success in the competition was reaching the second round of the competition on three occasions. They were able to reach the group stages in 2004–05, 2007–08 and 2008–09, but failed to secure qualification to round of 32. UEFA then introduced Europa League competition which had slightly changed format compared to that of the UEFA Cup. Dinamo was able to qualify for the group stage of the initial 2009–10 Europa League season after beating Scottish side Hearts 4–2 on aggregate.

In domestic competitions, the club was able to secure five league titles and won the Croatian Cup on six occasions, in addition to four Croatian Supercups. The club has also produced many footballing talents that have represented the Croatia national team on the international level in the 2000s, most notably Luka Modrić, Eduardo, Vedran Ćorluka, Niko Kranjčar and Tomislav Butina. Dinamo once again qualified for the Europa League in 2010–11, finishing third in group D behind PAOK and Villarreal and ahead of Club Brugge. Dinamo was very close to finishing second after wins against Villarreal at home (2–0) and Club Brugge away (0–2), but failed to win in their last game against PAOK at home (lost 0–1), thus failing to qualify for the next stage.

Dinamo managed to reach the group stage of the Champions League in 2011 after beating Neftçi Bakı (3–0 at home, 0–0 away), HJK Helsinki (2–1 away, 1–0 at home) and Malmö FF (4–1 at home, lost 2–0 away). They were drawn in group D alongside Real Madrid, Lyon and Ajax. Dinamo finished last in the group stage, with a −19 goal difference and 22 total goals conceded. They lost both matches against all teams—Real Madrid (0–1 at home, 2–6 away), Lyon (1–7 at home, 0–2 away) and Ajax (0–2 at home, 0–4 away). The only highlight of the campaign being two late consolation goals in the final match of the group at the Santiago Bernabéu Stadium, the only goals Real Madrid conceded in that group.

The following season, Dinamo once again managed to qualify for the Champions League group stage after defeating Ludogorets Razgrad, Sheriff Tiraspol and NK Maribor. They were drawn in group A alongside Porto, Dynamo Kyiv and Paris Saint-Germain. However, they failed to reach the next stage after recording just one point and a −13 goal difference, with their best result a 1–1 draw with Dynamo Kyiv at the Stadion Maksimir.

==== Intermediate years (2015–18) ====
In the 2015–16 Champions League, they defeated Fola Esch 4–1 (1–1 at home, 3–0 away) in the second qualifying round, Molde 4–4 (1–1 at home, 3–3 away, winning on away goals) in the third qualifying round, and Skënderbeu Korçë 6–2 (2–1 away, 4–1 at home) in play-off round, later being drawn into group F alongside Bayern Munich, Arsenal and Olympiacos, where they notably defeated Arsenal 2–1 at home on 16 September 2015. The club won the domestic double, securing both the league title and the national cup.

In the 2016–17 season, Dinamo failed to win the league title for the first time since the 2004–05 season, and also failed to win the cup for the first time since 2014. In the 2016–17 UEFA Champions League, they defeated Vardar 5–3 (2–1 away, 3–2 at home) in the second qualifying round, Dinamo Tbilisi 3–0 (2–0 at home, 1–0 away) and Red Bull Salzburg (1–1 home, 2–1 away after extra time). They were drawn in Group H against Juventus, Sevilla and Lyon. However, the club endured an extremely unsuccessful group campaign, scoring zero goals and conceding fifteen in six matches. The club also failed to win the league title and the cup, losing both trophies to rivals Rijeka. The 2016–17 season was considered by many as one of Dinamo's most unsuccessful seasons in the club's history.

In the 2017–18 season, Dinamo agreed a kit deal with German multinational company Adidas. Their qualifying campaign for Europa League began in the third round, beating Norwegian club Odds, 2–1 on aggregate (2–1 home, 0–0 away), but were knocked out by Albanian side Skënderbeu Korçë (1–1 home, 0–0 away, losing on away goals). The club failed to qualify for European competition for the first time since 2006. The club's league campaign was successful, going unbeaten for 21 games before losing to rivals Hajduk Split, but two abysmal performances against Rijeka and Lokomotiva caused Mario Cvitanović to resign from his position as manager. Nikola Jurčević then took over as manager. However, after a disastrous form in early May, Jurčević was sacked as manager.

==== Bjelica era (2018–20) ====
After much speculation, Nenad Bjelica, who was recently released from his previous club Lech Poznań, took over as manager of the club. Dinamo won the 2017–18 Prva HNL title, and won the 2017–18 Croatian Cup, beating Hajduk in the final.

On 6 June 2018, the former executive director and advisor of the club, Zdravko Mamić, was sentenced to a six-and-a-half-year prison sentence for corruption. On the same day, the club released a statement on their official website, in which they claimed that they were "shocked" with the verdict, also claiming that they "firmly believe" that Zdravko Mamić and the others who were sentenced are innocent.

In the 2018–19 UEFA Europa League, Dinamo qualified for the knockout phase, making it the first time in 49 years that the club would play in European competitions in the winter. In the Round of 32, Dinamo drew Czech side Viktoria Plzeň, losing 2–1 in the first leg but roaring back to an aggregate win with a 3–0 home victory. In the Round of 16, Dinamo drew Portuguese side Benfica, win 1–0 at home in front of 29,704 people. In the second leg game against Benfica, Dinamo conceded 1 goal before going to an extra time. In extra time, Benfica managed to score two more goals, winning the game 3–0; on aggregate 3–1 and proceeding to the quarter-finals. Because of Dinamo's success in the 2018–19 UEFA Europa League, the Prva HNL reached the 15th place on the UEFA country coefficient table, which brings two places in the 2020–21 UEFA Champions League qualifying campaign, thus meaning that a half of the Prva HNL will play in European competitions.

At the start of the 2019–20 season, Dinamo beat Saburtalo Tbilisi 5–0 on aggregate in the second qualifying round, Ferencváros 5–1 on aggregate in the third qualifying round and Rosenborg 3–1 on aggregate in the play-offs of the 2019–20 UEFA Champions League and securing a group stage spot once again after three years. The draw concluded that Dinamo will play in the Group C with Manchester City, Shakhtar Donetsk and Atalanta. Even though Dinamo has been considered as a complete outsider in the group, to the surprise of many, Dinamo beat Atalanta, who finished third in the previous season of Serie A, 4–0 at home in Zagreb, which is the highest ever win in the Champions League for Dinamo in the history of the club. However, the club could not qualify for the next round, finishing on the last position in the Champions League group with a win and a loss against Atalanta (4–0, 0–2), two draws against Shakhtar Donetsk (2–2, 3–3) and two losses against Manchester City (0–2, 1–4). On 16 April 2020, during the COVID-19 pandemic, Bjelica announced that he is leaving the club after consultations with the board through mutual agreement.

==== Second Zoran Mamić era (2020–21) ====
After Bjelica's departure and the short stint of Igor Jovićević, the club announced that Zoran Mamić will be appointed as the new manager. After an unsuccessful 2020–21 UEFA Champions League qualifying campaign, Dinamo qualified for the 2020–21 UEFA Europa League, after beating the Estonian club Flora Tallinn 3–1 in the play-off round. Dinamo got drawn in the Group K together with Feyenoord, CSKA Moscow and Wolfsberg. They started their group stage campaign with two goalless draws against Feyenoord and CSKA Moscow. In the third match of the group stage, Dinamo got their first win with a 1–0 win against Wolfsberg. Afterwards, Dinamo went onto a four-game winning streak after beating Wolfsberg with 3–0, Feyenoord with 2–0 and CSKA Moscow with 3–1, thus reaching the 2020–21 UEFA Europa League Round of 32 undefeated and with only one goal conceded, making them the club with the least goals conceded in the 2020–21 UEFA Europa League group stage.

As of the 34th minute in their last match in the group stage against CSKA Moscow, Dinamo Zagreb made history by not conceding a single goal for 526 minutes, a record previously held by Manchester United, which is the longest time span without a goal conceded in all of the football competitions held by UEFA, including the UEFA Champions League and the UEFA Europa League.

In the Round of 32, Dinamo got drawn with Krasnodar, who reached the Round of 32 after being 3rd placed in the 2020–21 UEFA Champions League group stage. In the first leg, Dinamo managed to beat Krasnodar away with the score of 3–2, while in the second leg, Dinamo beat Krasnodar with the score of 1–0, thus remaining undefeated in eight games of the 2020–21 UEFA Europa League. Dinamo were then drawn to play Tottenham Hotspur in the Round of 16. Due to COVID-19 travel restrictions, Dinamo and Tottenham were forced to reverse the order of ties and thus Dinamo played the first leg away, in which they lost 2–0. In the second leg, however, Mislav Oršić's hat-trick, of which the last goal came in extra time to complete the comeback, sent Dinamo to the quarter-finals after winning 3–2 on aggregate.

On 15 March, Mamić resigned from the position as club manager and sports director after the verdict of the Osijek Municipal Court was confirmed by the Supreme Court of Croatia. Mamić and three others (including his older brother Zdravko) were charged with tax evasion worth 12.2 million HRK and for siphoning off 116 million HRK from transfers of players from Dinamo. Assistant coach Damir Krznar was named Mamić's replacement the same day. Despite this, Dinamo's journey in Europa League ended in the quarter-finals with a 1–3 on aggregate score defeat against Villarreal.

== Honours ==
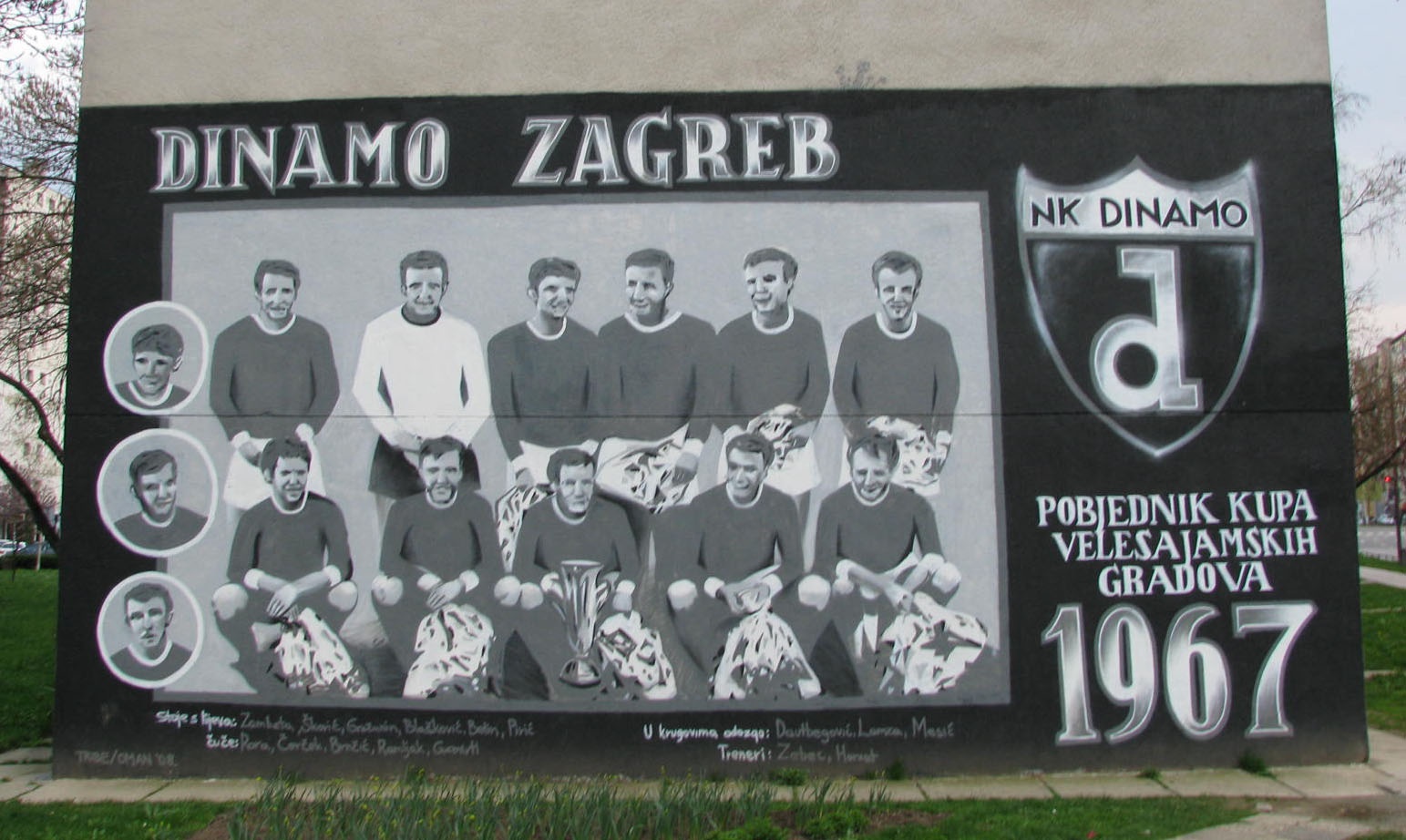
A mural in Zagreb commemorating the club's 1966–67 Inter-Cities Fairs Cup-winning generation.

Dinamo Zagreb's tally of 25 Prva HNL titles is the highest in Croatian football. They were runners-up in the league four times, and only on four occasions have they concluded a season of Prva HNL finishing out of the top two places in the final standings. The team is also the most successful Croatian Cup competitor, appearing so far in 23 of the Cup's 29 staged finals, 16 of which they have won. In addition, the club also holds the record for most Croatian Supercup titles, appearing in eleven matches and winning eight times. Furthermore, the team managed to achieve the double twelve times, being both the Prva HNL champions and the Croatian Cup winners from 1996 to 1998, again from 2007 to 2009, from 2011 to 2012, 2015 to 2018 and most recently in season 2020–21.

During the time Dinamo competed in the Yugoslav football league system, they were Yugoslav First League champions nine times. The team had won 8 Yugoslav Cup editions. Overall the club won 72 official domestic titles and one competitive international tournament. The league title in 2014–15 is in bold because it is the only unbeaten season in the Croatian First Football League history. The club also claims the titles won during the HŠK Građanski period (marked in italics).

GNK Dinamo Zagreb honours
Type	Competition	Titles	Seasons
International	Balkans Cup	1	1976–77
International	Inter-Cities Fairs Cup	1	1966–67
Domestic	Prva HNL	**26**	1992–93, 1995–96, 1996–97, 1997–98, 1998–99, 1999–00, 2002–03, 2005–06, 2006–07, 2007–08, 2008–09, 2009–10, 2010–11, 2011–12, 2012–13, 2013–14, 2014–15, 2015–16, 2017–18, 2018–19, 2019–20, 2020–21, 2021–22, 2022–23, 2023–24, 2025–26
Domestic	Yugoslav First League	9	1923, 1926, 1928, 1936–37, 1939–40, 1947–48, 1953–54, 1957–58, 1981–82
Domestic	Croatian Football Cup	**18**	1993–94, 1995–96, 1996–97, 1997–98, 2000–01, 2001–02, 2003–04, 2006–07, 2007–08, 2008–09, 2010–11, 2011–12, 2014–15, 2015–16, 2017–18, 2020–21, 2023–24, 2025–26
Domestic	Yugoslav Cup	8	1938, 1951, 1959–60, 1962–63, 1964–65, 1968–69, 1979–80, 1982–83
Domestic	Croatian Football Super Cup	**8**	2002, 2003, 2006, 2010, 2013, 2019, 2022, 2023

- record

=== Doubles ===
- League and Cup (14, record): 1995–96, 1996–97, 1997–98, 2006–07, 2007–08, 2008–09, 2010–11, 2011–12, 2014–15, 2015–16, 2017–18, 2020–21, 2023–24, 2025–26

=== Other Titles ===
- **Croatian First League**
  - Winners (2): 1941, 1943
- **Croatian Pokal**
  - Winners (1): 1941

== GNK Dinamo in European football ==
GNK Dinamo played their first European Cup match against Czechoslovak side Dukla Prague in 1958. In the 1960s Dinamo experienced their most successful period in both domestic and European football which saw them win four Yugoslav Cups but failing to clinch a single championship title, finishing runners-up five times between 1960 and 1969. On the European stage, the club had two successful campaigns in the Inter-Cities Fairs Cup, reaching the finals on two occasions. In the 1963 final Dinamo lost to Valencia, but in 1967 they beat England's Leeds United. This was the only European silverware won by a Yugoslav club until Red Star Belgrade won the 1990–91 European Cup 24 years later. Dinamo played semifinal of UEFA Cup Winners' Cup in 1960–61 and two quarterfinals in 1964–65 and 1969–70. They reached UEFA Europa League quarterfinal in 2020–21 and round of 16 in 2018–19. Dinamo also won the Balkans Cup in 1976.

=== By competition ===
Note: This summary includes matches played in the Inter-Cities Fairs Cup, which was not endorsed by UEFA and is not counted in UEFA's official European statistics.
Defunct competitions are listed in italics.
Pld = Matches played; W = Matches won; D = Matches drawn; L = Matches lost; GF = Goals for; GA = Goals against

Competition	Pld	W	D	L	GF	GA	Last season played
UEFA Champions League European Cup	170	72	35	63	258	235	2024–25
UEFA Europa League UEFA Cup	145	58	32	55	204	179	2025–26
UEFA Europa Conference League	10	5	1	4	15	11	2023–24
UEFA Cup Winners' Cup	31	11	6	14	31	38	1994–95
Inter-Cities Fairs Cup	39	16	10	13	65	47	1970–71
Total	395	162	84	149	573	510	–

Last updated on 11 December 2025. after match GNK Dinamo 1:3 Real Betis, Source: UEFA.com

=== By ground ===
Overall	Pld	W	D	L	GF	GA	GD
Home^{1}	187	94	43	50	340	206	+134
Away^{2}	190	60	38	92	210	274	−64
Total	377	154	81	142	545	473	+66

Last updated on 22 February 2024. after match GNK Dinamo – Real Betis 1:1, Source: UEFA.com

=== Best results in International competitions ===
Season	Achievement	Notes
European Cup / UEFA Champions League
1998–99	Group stage	2nd in the group behind (Greece) Olympiacos, ahead of (Portugal) Porto and (Netherlands) Ajax
UEFA Cup / UEFA Europa League
2020–21	Quarter-finals	lost to (Spain) Villarreal 0–1 in Zagreb, 1–2 in Villarreal
UEFA Europa Conference League
2023–24	Round of 16	lost to (Greece) PAOK 2–1 in Zagreb, 0–5 in Thessaloniki
UEFA Cup Winners' Cup
1960–61	Semi-finals	lost to (Italy) Fiorentina 2–1 in Zagreb, 0–3 in Florence
Inter-Cities Fairs Cup
1966–67	Winners	defeated (England) Leeds United 2–0 in Zagreb, 0–0 in Leeds
Balkans Cup
1976	Winners	defeated (Romania) Sportul Studențesc 3–1 in Zagreb, 2–3 in Bucharest

=== UEFA Team ranking ===
As of 5 July 2026

Rank	Team	Points
51	(Turkey) Galatasaray	38.500
52	(France) Marseille	38.000
53	(Scotland) Celtic	38.000
54	(Croatia) Dinamo Zagreb	37.500
55	(Netherlands) Ajax	36.250
56	(Greece) PAOK	35.250
57	(Spain) Villarreal	35.000

== Finances and ownership ==
Dinamo Zagreb is a registered corporate personhood, more precisely a nonprofit organization that, unlike the football clubs organized as limited companies, does not issue shares, and, consistently with the Croatian law for citizens' associations, does not pay income tax. Consequently, the club is obliged to issue publicly assessible memberships. Each legally capable member of Dinamo has an equal say in its democratic processes; for example, the elections for the representatives in the chairmanship of the club.

In April 2024, Dinamo released its accounts for the 2023 calendar year. It showed operating revenue of €20.12m and a net profit after tax of €4.44m. The drivers of the result were player wage expenses of €20.95m and profit on player sales of €37.42m. The 2022 calendar year accounts showed operating revenue of €43.60m, boosted by UEFA Champions League participation, and a net profit of €1.16m.

The members of an initiative Zajedno za Dinamo [Together for Dinamo], composed of club supporters, have been claiming that the club was silently privatised by its executive president Zdravko Mamić, and that it functions as an evidently unlawful "public limited citizens' association". Subsequently, the tax exemption granted to the club by the constitutional law came under heavy criticism, particularly in the light of the club's lucrative transfers arranged at the start of the 2000s. Jutarnji list journalist Romana Eibl asserted that during this period the club had as much as 1.36 billion kuna of untaxed revenue, partly from selling its players, while approximately 360 million kuna were received from public funds. The former director of the club Damir Vrbanović argued that the transfers do not offer a long-term source of revenue for the club, and that the club is therefore justified in remaining a nonprofit organization.

In spite of all criticism and controversy, Mamić is moderately praised for being unprecedented in arranging some of the club's most profitable transfers of the Croatian players to top European clubs. These include the transfers (Note: Only the initial fees of the transfers are taken into account.) of Boško Balaban to Aston Villa for €7.8 million in 2001; Eduardo to Arsenal for €13.5 million and Vedran Ćorluka to Manchester City for €13 million in 2007; Luka Modrić to Tottenham Hotspur for €21 million in 2008; Dejan Lovren to Lyon for €8 million; Mario Mandžukić to Wolfsburg for €7 million in 2010; and Mateo Kovačić to Internazionale for €11 million in 2013.

== Grounds ==
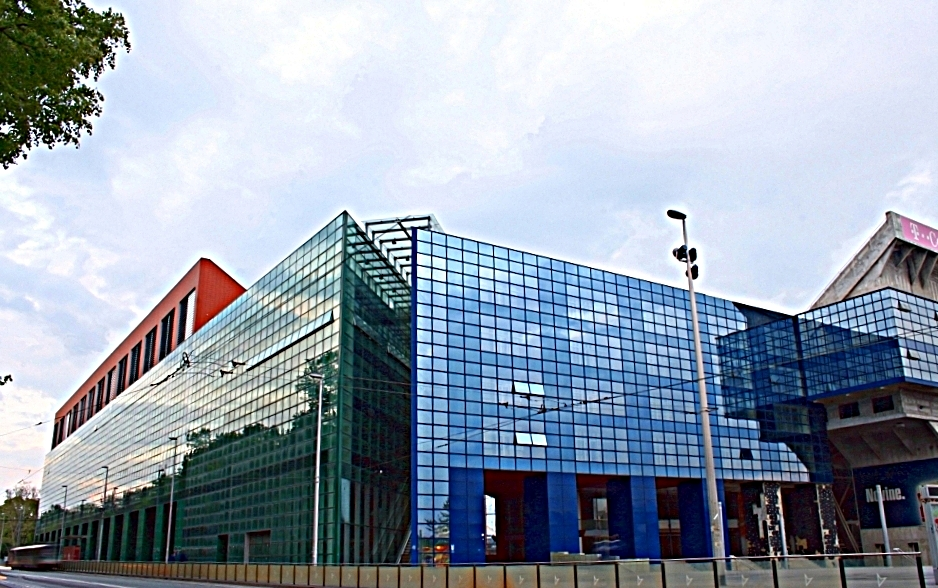
Stadion Maksimir exterior

Dinamo Zagreb's home stadium is Stadion Maksimir. The stadium is situated in the northeastern part of Zagreb, opposite the city's largest urban park, Maksimir, which also lends its name to the eponymous neighbourhood. It was officially opened on 5 May 1912 and has been noticeably upgraded several times thereafter, most recently in 2011. The stadium was initially used by HAŠK, and the club became its tenant only in 1948, after the stadium was rebuilt. Before moving to Maksimir, the club played its home matches at the former Građanski Zagreb's stadium Stadion Koturaška. It is there that the club played its first official match on 23 June 1945. Its first match at the Stadion Maksimir was played on 19 September 1948 in front of a crowd of 40,000 spectators.

The design of Stadion Maksimir initially included a single grandstand in a shape of a horseshoe that faced the other, much smaller stand to the north. The north stand was altered from the ground up in 1998, when it was replaced by a 10,965 all-seater stand, and also a building with 15,000 square meters of office space covered in a glazed façade. The north stand's capacity is nowadays reduced to 9,460 seats. As for the original grandstand, it is now replaced by three separate stands, although their present-day design came about after a long and toilsome process of numerous renovations, which have started almost immediately after the stadium was rebuilt in 1948. Some of the best Croatian architects at the time, such as Vladimir Turina, Eugen Erlich and Franjo Neidhardt, worked on this project. Prior to Croatian secession from Yugoslavia, the restructuring of the stadium was never completed as thoroughly as it was planned, mostly because of an array of bureaucratic obstacles. Lastly, it was put in order for the 1987 Summer Universiade, but even then the final appearance of the stadium was less satisfactory than what was to be expected.

Some progress was finally made in 1997 when seats were installed on both the east and south stands. Shortly before the 1999 Summer Military World Games, the west and also the largest stand of the stadium was renovated. It comprised 12,600 seats, and a VIP section with 718 seats that also included a presidential lodge. By this time, the total maintenance expenses for Stadion Maksimir have climbed up to 362.4 million kuna. In 2006, the then-mayor of Zagreb Milan Bandić announced a project worth €150 million that would see Stadion Maksimir once again completely rebuilt. By 2010, the taxpayers have vested another 288 million kuna on maintenance and restoration of the stadium, but no significant improvements were made. The arranged reconstruction of Stadion Maksimir soon became an enormous financial problem for the city, and for a brief period of time Bandić was planning to call a referendum in which the citizens of Zagreb would decide whether to continue with investments into Stadion Maksimir, or rather to build a brand new Stadion Kajzerica. The referendum was never held and both projects were ultimately abandoned in 2012. Nevertheless, some crucial work was done between 2011 and 2013, when the club replaced all of the seats from the four existing stands, installed the under-soil heating, ameliorated the interior of the stadium, and made some aesthetic adjustments, among others, to the colour of the stands and of the tartan track surrounding the pitch. Currently, Stadion Maksimir is listed as a 35,123 all-seater.

== Club culture, supporters and politics ==
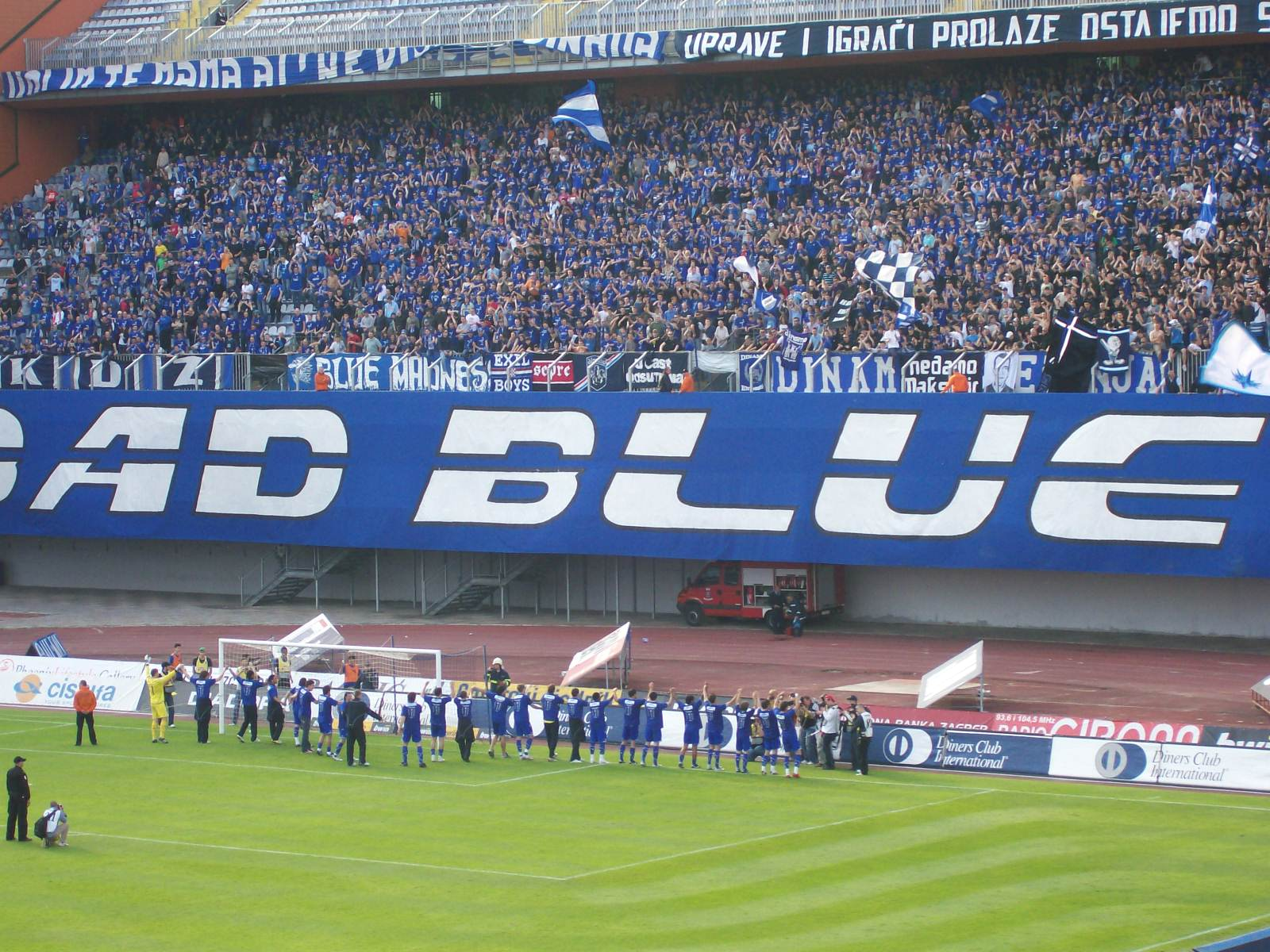
Bad Blue Boys tifo display

Although Dinamo Zagreb had followers since its founding, its first organised supporters' group emerged in 1986 under the name Bad Blue Boys (BBB). According to the BBB's official website, the name was inspired by the 1983 film Bad Boys. Following its establishment, the group gained attention in Zagreb and expanded into multiple neighbourhoods, and became known across the Yugoslavia for self-organised travel to Dinamo Zagreb away matches, expressing support for the club, the city of Zagreb, and Croatia. During home matches, the BBB occupy the north stand of Stadion Maksimir. The BBB and other Dinamo supporters consider Hajduk Split fans, particularly the ultras group Torcida Split, to be their principal rivals.

Dinamo Zagreb supporters have been linked to hooliganism and far-right politics since the 1990s. The Bad Blue Boys were involved in violent clashes during the 1990 Yugoslav league match against Red Star Belgrade at the Maksimir Stadium, an event that has been commemorated annually by the group as a symbolic precursor to the Croatian War of Independence. In the 2000s and 2010s, members of the Bad Blue Boys were repeatedly associated with nationalist and fascist imagery, including the use of Ustasha symbols and slogans such as "Za dom spremni", and performing fascist salutes at matches both domestically and abroad. In April 2018, 14 men identifying as members of the Bad Blue Boys were indicted in Salzburg, Austria, for glorifying the World War II Ustaše regime and performing Nazi salutes. The men were arrested for singing Ustaše songs and for performing fascist salutes in Salzburg. Police also seized materials promoting Ustaše and Nazi ideology. In June 2020, Croatian police detained four individuals, reportedly supporters of Dinamo Zagreb, after they displayed a banner in Zagreb reading "We will fuck Serbian women and children" and chanted "kill, kill the Serb" while waving torches. The group also displayed symbols associated with the pro-Nazi Ustaše militia. Croatian Prime Minister Andrej Plenković described the incident as "unacceptable" and inappropriate for a public setting, while Education Minister Blaženka Divjak called it "disgusting". In September 2022, Dinamo fans were seen performing fascist salutes before a game against AC Milan.

In July 2013, FARE reported homophobic and racist chanting by the group during domestic matches against NK Osijek, and European fixtures against Fola Esch and Sheriff Tiraspol, resulting in UEFA fines and partial stadium closures. In 2016, Croatian authorities and UEFA recorded multiple incidents of Bad Blue Boys’ involvement in hooliganism, including violent clashes with rival supporters and acts of vandalism. In April 2019, UEFA sanctioned Dinamo Zagreb by ordering a home European match to be played behind closed doors and levying fines following racist behaviour by supporters during a Europa League match against S.L. Benfica on 7 March. In August 2023, over 100 members of the Bad Blue Boys were detained in Athens following the fatal stabbing of AEK Athens fan Michalis Katsouris in premeditated violence before a Champions League qualifier, with further arrests in Zagreb in September 2023.

Zlatko Hasanbegović was an active member of the Bad Blue Boys before serving as Croatia's Minister of Culture. Hasanbegović has documented associations with far-right groups and, in his earlier writings for a pro-Ustaše publication, expressed positive views of the Ustaše movement.

== Club rivalries ==
Dinamo's biggest rivals are Hajduk Split, and the matches between the two teams are referred to as "Eternal Derby" or "Croatian Derby". Their rivalry can be traced back to the 1920s when Dinamo's predecessor HŠK Građanski played against Hajduk Split and riots on the field occurred. HŠK Građanski and Hajduk remained the biggest rivals till 1945, when Građanski was disbanded. After Dinamo inherited Građanski they continued their rivalry with Hajduk Split. Matches between the two clubs are recognized as the most anticipated event of Croatian club football, which attracts the greatest number of spectators and most media attention of all the football matches in Croatia. It is considered as the battle of the north and south of Croatia.

There is also a rivalry with HNK Rijeka, which especially became fierce in 2010s when Rijeka became strongest challenger for title and cup. In early 2020s, NK Osijek also became the contender after the Hungarian takeover, which led to bigger rivalry between clubs. In Yugoslav times, major rivalries also included Serbian clubs Red Star Belgrade and Partizan. Even after the breakup of Yugoslavia the hatred still remained. Despite spending some time of their history playing in the same division as Dinamo, and being from same city, NK Zagreb and NK Lokomotiva Zagreb are not considered major rivals by the fans.

== Players ==
=== Current squad ===
As of 5 September 2026

Note: Flags indicate national team as defined under FIFA eligibility rules; some limited exceptions apply. Players may hold more than one non-FIFA nationality.

No.	Pos.	Nation	Player
1	GK	CRO	Danijel Zagorac
3	DF	CRO	Bruno Goda
5	MF	RUS	Kirill Kravtsov
6	DF	BIH	Stjepan Radeljić
7	FW	ESP	Dani Rodríguez
8	MF	SLO	Miha Zajc
9	FW	CRO	Dion Drena Beljo
10	MF	CRO	Luka Stojković
11	FW	ALB	Arbër Hoxha
13	DF	PHI	Paul Tabinas
14	FW	BIH	Smail Prevljak
15	DF	CRO	Niko Galešić
17	MF	CRO	Luka Ivanušec
19	FW	SLO	Aleks Stojaković
20	MF	CRO	Robert Mudražija

No.	Pos.	Nation	Player
21	FW	CRO	Mateo Lisica
22	DF	SWE	Matteo Pérez Vinlöf
23	FW	ESP	Iker Almena (on loan from Al Qadsiah)
24	GK	CRO	Dominik Kotarski (on loan from Copenhagen)
25	DF	CRO	Moris Valinčić
26	DF	SCO	Scott McKenna
27	MF	CRO	Josip Mišić (Captain)
30	FW	CRO	Fran Topić
33	GK	CRO	Ivan Nevistić
36	DF	ESP	Sergi Domínguez
41	MF	SLO	Sven Šunta
44	GK	CRO	Ivan Filipović
77	FW	FRA	Noah Nsoki
80	MF	CRO	Lukas Kačavenda
99	FW	CRO	Mislav Oršić

=== Players with dual citizenship ===
- (Croatia) (Germany) Niko Galešić
- (Albania) (Kosovo) Arber Hoxha
- (Sweden) (Peru) Matteo Pérez Vinlöf
- (Bosnia and Herzegovina) (Croatia) Stjepan Radeljić
- (Croatia) (Bosnia and Herzegovina) Fran Topić
- (France) (Democratic Republic of the Congo) Noah Nsoki

=== Youth academy ===
The following players have previously made appearances or have appeared on the substitutes bench for the first team.

Note: Flags indicate national team as defined under FIFA eligibility rules; some limited exceptions apply. Players may hold more than one non-FIFA nationality.

No.	Pos.	Nation	Player
4	MF	GHA	Fuzy Taylor (on loan from Medeama)
16	DF	CRO	Noa Mikić
28	MF	BUL	Kaloyan Bozhkov
29	FW	CRO	Mislav Ćutuk
31	MF	CRO	Jona Benkotić
32	FW	CRO	Gabrijel Šivalec

No.	Pos.	Nation	Player
42	DF	CRO	Petar Šimun Žaja
45	DF	CRO	Borna Orlić
46	MF	CRO	Krešimir Radoš
47	FW	CRO	Patrik Horvat
49	DF	CRO	Nikola Radnić
55	MF	CRO	Josip Brundić

=== Out on loan ===
Note: Flags indicate national team as defined under FIFA eligibility rules; some limited exceptions apply. Players may hold more than one non-FIFA nationality.

No.	Pos.	Nation	Player
16	DF	ESP	Raúl Torrente (at (France) Le Mans until 30 June 2027)
42	DF	CRO	Marko Zebić (at (Croatia) Rudeš until 10 January 2027)
70	FW	COL	Juan Córdoba (at (Colombia) Independiente Medellín until 30 June 2027)
88	GK	CRO	Nikola Čavlina (at (Poland) Wieczysta Kraków until 30 June 2027)

No.	Pos.	Nation	Player
—	GK	CRO	Antonio Rajić (at (Croatia) Kustošija until 26 June 2027)
—	DF	MAR	Samy Mmaee (at (Cyprus) Pafos until 30 June 2027)
—	FW	CRO	Lovre Kulušić (at (Croatia) Lokomotiva Zagreb until 30 June 2027)

=== Former players ===
The following is a list of former Dinamo players which have made significant contributions to the club while playing for its first team. The list is sorted in alphabetical order and in accordance with the specified inclusion criteria. Players that were named in the club's "Best 11" squad are excluded from the list.

- (North Macedonia) Arijan Ademi
- (Croatia) Milan Badelj
- (Croatia) Martin Baturina
- (Croatia) Igor Bišćan
- (Socialist Federal Republic of Yugoslavia) Filip Blašković
- (Socialist Federal Republic of Yugoslavia) Srećko Bogdan
- (Socialist Federal Republic of Yugoslavia) Marijan Brnčić
- (Croatia) Marcelo Brozović
- (Socialist Federal Republic of Yugoslavia) Snješko Cerin
- (Croatia) Igor Cvitanović
- (Socialist Federal Republic of Yugoslavia) Marijan Čerček
- (Croatia) Eduardo
- (Switzerland) Mario Gavranović
- (Bosnia and Herzegovina) Amer Gojak
- (Socialist Federal Republic of Yugoslavia) Josip Gucmirtl
- (Croatia) Joško Gvardiol
- (Croatia) Luka Ivanušec
- (Croatia) Mateo Kovačić
- (Croatia) Andrej Kramarić
- (Socialist Federal Republic of Yugoslavia) Zlatko Kranjčar
- (Croatia) Dominik Livaković
- (Croatia) Lovro Majer
- (Croatia) Mario Mandžukić
- (Iran) Sadegh Moharrami
- (Socialist Federal Republic of Yugoslavia) Marijan Novak
- (Spain) Dani Olmo
- (Croatia) Mislav Oršić
- (Croatia) Bruno Petković
- (Socialist Federal Republic of Yugoslavia) Denijal Pirić
- (Croatia) Josip Pivarić
- (Croatia) Robert Prosinečki
- (Socialist Federal Republic of Yugoslavia) Mladen Ramljak
- (North Macedonia) Stefan Ristovski
- (Socialist Federal Republic of Yugoslavia) Krasnodar Rora
- (Croatia) Sammir
- (Socialist Federal Republic of Yugoslavia) Ivica Senzen
- (Socialist Federal Republic of Yugoslavia) Josip Šikić
- (Croatia) Dario Šimić
- (Croatia) Josip Šimunić
- (Croatia) Zvonimir Soldo
- (Algeria) Hillal Soudani
- (Croatia) Mario Stanić
- (Socialist Federal Republic of Yugoslavia) Želimir Stinčić
- (Slovenia) Petar Stojanović
- (Croatia) Petar Sučić
- (Croatia) Josip Šutalo
- (Socialist Federal Republic of Yugoslavia) Zlatko Škorić
- (Croatia) Stjepan Tomas
- (Portugal) Tonel
- (Socialist Federal Republic of Yugoslavia) Drago Vabec
- (Croatia) Domagoj Vida
- (Australia) Mark Viduka
- (Croatia) Goran Vlaović
- (Croatia) Šime Vrsaljko
- (Croatia) Ognjen Vukojević
- (Socialist Federal Republic of Yugoslavia) Franjo Wölfl
- (Socialist Federal Republic of Yugoslavia) Slaven Zambata

=== Best 11 ===
In 2016, the best squad in history of Dinamo was chosen by a group of experts, along with the club's fans, chose 11 of Dinamo Zagreb's former and current players to fit in an ideal squad in 4–4–2. Shown in brackets is a period in which the players played for the first team of the club.

Dinamo Zagreb's best 11 in history

Goalkeeper

- (Croatia) Dražen Ladić (1984–2000)

Defenders

- (Socialist Federal Republic of Yugoslavia) Rudolf Belin (1959–1970)
- (Socialist Federal Republic of Yugoslavia) Velimir Zajec (1974–1984)
- (Socialist Federal Republic of Yugoslavia) Ivica Horvat (1945–1957)
- (Socialist Federal Republic of Yugoslavia) Tomislav Crnković (1950–1961)

Midfielders

- (Croatia) Luka Modrić (2000–2008)
- (Socialist Federal Republic of Yugoslavia) Željko Perušić (1958–1965)
- (Croatia) Zvonimir Boban (1983–1991)
- (Croatia) Marko Mlinarić (1978–1987, 1995–1996)

Forwards

- (Socialist Federal Republic of Yugoslavia) Dražan Jerković (1954–1965)
- (Croatia) Davor Šuker (1989–1991)

=== Records ===
The following are lists of top players in terms of the number of appearances and goals for Dinamo Zagreb, as of 15 March 2023. The numbers include only official games.

Most appearances
#	Player	Career	Apps
1	Dražen Ladić	1986–2000	468
2	Arijan Ademi	2010–2023; 2023–2025	427
3	Mladen Ramljak	1962–1973	337
4	Marko Mlinarić	1978–1987; 1995–1996	307
5	Srećko Bogdan	1975–1985	303
6	Zlatko Kranjčar	1974–1983	301
6	Drago Vabec	1968–1977; 1977–1979; 1983–1984	301
8	Sammir	2007–2013; 2017	294
9	Filip Blašković	1965–1976	289
10	Edin Mujčin	1995–2001; 2002–2005	288

Top goalscorers
#	Player	Career	Goals
1	Igor Cvitanović	1989–1997; 1999–2002	165
2	Slaven Zambata	1959–1969; 1972–1973	148
3	Dražan Jerković	1954–1965	127
4	Zlatko Kranjčar	1973–1983	125
5	Snježan Cerin	1976–1986	116
6	Željko Čajkovski	1945–1956	100
7	Franjo Wölfl	1945–1953	96
8	Eduardo da Silva	2001–2007	92
9	Mislav Oršić	2018–2023	90
10	Goran Vlaović	1991–1994	89

== Personnel ==
Position	Staff
Head coach	(Croatia) Jerko Leko
Assistant coaches	(Croatia) Tomislav Žitković (Croatia) Tomislav Marić (Croatia) Kristijan Polovanec
Goalkeeping coaches	(Croatia) Gojko Mrčela (Croatia) Ivan Kelava
Fitness coaches	(Croatia) Ivan Štefanić (Croatia) Kristijan Blažević (Croatia) Mateo Matić
Performance analyst	(Croatia) Mihael Minđek
Technical director	(Croatia) Marko Kuže
Doctors	(Croatia) Božidar Šebečić (Croatia) Ivica Smodek (Croatia) Hrvoje Šojat (Croatia) Saša Janković
Physiotherapists	(Croatia) Ivan Zeba (Croatia) Sebastian Grgac (Croatia) Josip Jurić (Croatia) Zlatko Mihalić (Croatia) Matej Ivić
Kit managers	(Croatia) Tomislav Ciglar (Croatia) Ivan Vučković (Croatia) Fran Šačić
Spokesperson	(Croatia) Marko Bošnir
Safety officer	(Croatia) Marko Birač

Last updated: 10 November 2026
Source: GNK Dinamo Zagreb official website

== GNK Dinamo Foundation ==
The GNK Dinamo Foundation "Nema predaje" (lit. "Never give up") is the official charitable foundation of the club, founded in 2019 and in operation since 2020. The Foundation operates in the fields of humanitarian aid, sport, education and social solidarity. Since its inception it has made donations exceeding €500,000 and helped raise an additional €300,000.

== See also ==
- ŽNK Dinamo Zagreb
- Futsal Dinamo
- GNK Dinamo Zagreb Foundation "Nema predaje"
