= Cherif Fofana =

Spanish footballer (born 2009)

Personal information
- Full name: Moctar Cherif Acacio Fofana Mesie Eyegue
- Date of birth: 20 November 2009 (age 16)
- Place of birth: Alcalá de Henares, Spain
- Height: 1.79 m (5 ft 10 in)
- Position: Midfielder

Team information
- Current team: Real Madrid B
- Number: 42

Youth career
- 2016–2024: Alcalá
- 2024–2025: México FC
- 2025–: Real Madrid

Senior career*
Years	Team	Apps	(Gls)
2026–	Real Madrid B	1	(0)

International career^{‡}
2026–	Spain U17	4	(0)
- * Club domestic league appearances and goals ‡ National team caps and goals as of 23 April 2026

Moctar Cherif Acacio Fofana Mesie Eyegue (born 20 November 2009) is a Spanish professional footballer who plays as a midfielder for Real Madrid B.

== Early life ==
Fofana was born on 20 November 2009. Born in Spain, he was born to a Malian father and an Equatoguinean mother.

== Club career ==
As a youth player, Fofana joined the youth academy of Alcalá. Following his stint there, he joined the youth academy of México FC in 2024. Ahead of the 2024–25 season, he joined the youth academy of La Liga side Real Madrid and was promoted to the club's reserve team in 2026.

== International career ==
Fofana is a Spain youth international. During the spring of 2026, he played for the Spain national under-17 football team for 2026 UEFA European Under-17 Championship qualification.

== Style of play ==
Fofana plays as a midfielder. Spanish newspaper Sport wrote in 2026 that he "is a creator of advantages immediately after winning possession. He always offers a solution with his passing. He always plays with intent. He always accelerates the tempo. He uses his ball-carrying ability to extricate himself from compromising situations—especially in the half-spaces—and executes clean, aggressive yet measured tackles. This combination of winning the ball followed by a vertical outlet makes him a tremendously modern midfielder in today's game".
