= Kaloyan Bozhkov =

Bulgarian footballer (born 2008)

Personal information
- Full name: Kaloyan Bozhkov
- Date of birth: February 1, 2008 (age 18)
- Place of birth: Plovdiv, Bulgaria
- Position: Defensive midfielder

Team information
- Current team: Dinamo Zagreb
- Number: 28

Youth career
- Vekta Plovdiv
- Lokomotiv Plovdiv
- –2024: Ludogorets Razgrad
- 2024–2025: Lokomotiva Zagreb
- 2025–: Dinamo Zagreb

Senior career*
Years	Team	Apps	(Gls)
2026–	Dinamo Zagreb II	5	(1)
2026–	Dinamo Zagreb	0	(0)

International career^{‡}
2022–2023	Bulgaria U15	6	(2)
2023–2025	Bulgaria U17	14	(1)
2025–	Bulgaria U19	12	(1)
- * Club domestic league appearances and goals as of 19:12, 5 October 2026 (UTC) ‡ National team caps and goals as of 19:12, 5 October 2026 (UTC)

Kaloyan Bozhkov (Калоян Божков; born 1 February 2008) is a Bulgarian footballer who plays as a defensive midfielder for Croatian club Dinamo Zagreb.

In October 2025, he was named by English newspaper The Guardian as one of the best players born in 2008 worldwide, as part of their "Next Generation" series.

== Club career ==
Born in Plovdiv, Bozhkov began his career at the academy of Vekta Plovdiv, before going through the youth systems of Lokomotiv Plovdiv and Ludogorets Razgrad.

In early 2025, he spent a brief period with Croatian club Lokomotiva Zagreb. Despite his young age, he became a key player for their under-17 team, scoring 7 goals and providing 6 assists in 19 matches. In a notable moment from April 2025, Bozhkov played for the Bulgaria U17 national team in a European qualifier and, less than 24 hours later, came on as a half-time substitute for his club, helping them secure a 3–3 draw.

Following his impressive performances, in August 2025, Bozhkov completed a transfer to Croatian giants Dinamo Zagreb, joining their under-19 team. After a period of injury recovery, he returned to action for the club in October 2025.

== International career ==
Bozhkov has represented Bulgaria at all youth levels. He made his debut for the under-15 team in August 2022. He later became the captain and a key player for the under-17 team, earning 14 caps and scoring 1 goal. In 2025, he made his debut for the under-19 squad.

== Career statistics ==
As of match played 9 September 2026

Appearances and goals by club, season and competition
Club	Season	League			National cup		Europe		Other		Total	
Club	Season	Division	Apps	Goals	Apps	Goals	Apps	Goals	Apps	Goals	Apps	Goals
Dinamo Zagreb II	2025–26	Croatian First League	0	0	—		—		5 (Note: Appearances in Premier League Cup)	2	5	2
Dinamo Zagreb II	2026–27	Croatian First League	4	1	—		—		—		4	1
Dinamo Zagreb II	Total		4	1	—		—		5	2	9	3
Dinamo Zagreb	2026–27	Croatian Football League	0	0	1	0	0	0	—		1	0
Career total			4	1	1	0	0	0	5	2	10	3
