= Chris Grombahi =

Portuguese footballer (born 2008)

Personal information
- Full name: Chris Ivan Grombahi
- Date of birth: 20 August 2008 (age 18)
- Place of birth: Abidjan, Ivory Coast
- Height: 1.72 m (5 ft 8 in)
- Position: Winger

Team information
- Current team: Sporting B
- Number: 57

Youth career
- 2015–2017: Alta de Lisboa
- 2017–2025: Sporting

Senior career*
Years	Team	Apps	(Gls)
2025–	Sporting	0	(0)
2026	→ Club NXT (loan)	2	(0)
2026–	Sporting B	3	(0)

International career^{‡}
2026–	Portugal U19	1	(0)
- * Club domestic league appearances and goals as of 14 September 2026 ‡ National team caps and goals as of 30 September 2026

Chris Ivan Grombahi (born 20 August 2008) is a professional football player who plays as a winger for Liga Portugal 2 club Sporting B. Born in the Ivory Coast, he represents Portugal internationally.

== Club career ==
Born in 2008, Grombahi arrived to Portugal as a refugee in 2015 and started playing football with Alta de Lisboa, before joining Sporting's youth academy in 2017. On 13 February 2023, he signed a youth contract with Sporting. On 3 February 2025, he signed his first professional contract with Sporting. On 28 October 2025 he debuted with the senior Sporting team in a 5–1 Taça da Liga win over Alverca.

On 20 February 2026, Grombahi was loaned by Club Brugge in Belgium for their reserve team Club NXT in the second-tier Challenger Pro League until the end of the season, with an option to sigh a three-year contract afterwards. He returned to Sporting at the end of the loan, where he was assigned to the reserve team Sporting B of Liga Portugal 2.

== International career ==
In September 2026, Grombahi was called up to the Portugal national under-19 team.
