= Daniel Jóhannesson =

Icelandic footballer (born 2007)

Personal information
- Full name: Daniel Ingi Jóhannesson
- Date of birth: 3 April 2007 (age 19)
- Place of birth: Manchester, England
- Height: 1.81 m (5 ft 11 in)
- Position: Midfielder

Team information
- Current team: Kolding (on loan from Nordsjælland)
- Number: 20

Youth career
- –2022: ÍA

Senior career*
| Years | Team | Apps | (Gls) |
| 2022–2023 | ÍA | 9 | (2) |
| 2023– | Nordsjælland | 2 | (0) |
| 2026– | → Kolding (loan) | 1 | (0) |

International career^{‡}
| 2022–2023 | Iceland U17 | 11 | (4) |
| 2024–2025 | Iceland U19 | 14 | (4) |
- * Club domestic league appearances and goals as of 23 August 2026 ‡ National team caps and goals as of 15:37, 18 November 2025 (UTC)

Daniel Ingi Jóhannesson (born 3 April 2007) is a professional footballer who plays as a midfielder for Danish 1st Division club Kolding IF, on loan from Danish Superliga club Nordsjælland. Born in England, he represents Iceland at youth level.

== Club career ==
Jóhannesson made history on 1 August 2022, becoming ÍA's youngest ever player at 15 years and 119 days when he came on as a late substitute for Kaj Leo í Bartalsstovu in ÍA's 3–1 away loss to Breiðablik in the Besta deild karla. The following year, in April 2023, he trialled with Danish side Nordsjælland. During his time in Denmark, he also attracted the attention of Copenhagen. In May 2023, it was confirmed that Jóhannesson had decided to join Nordsjælland, with the deal going through on the opening of the summer transfer window: 1 July 2023. He broke Arnar Gunnlaugsson's thirty-four-year-old record for ÍA's youngest goal-scorer on 9 June 2023, scoring the only goal in a 1–0 win against Ægir at 16 years and 67 days old.

== International career ==
Born in Manchester in the United Kingdom, Jóhannesson was eligible to represent the England national team and the Iceland national team.

Jóhannesson has featured for Iceland at under-16, under-17 and under-19 level.

== Personal life ==
Hailing from a footballing family, Jóhannesson is the brother of Icelandic international Ísak Jóhannesson, and both are the sons of Joey Guðjónsson, and the grandsons of Guðjón Þórðarson, who both also represented Iceland at international level. His paternal uncles, Bjarni Guðjónsson, Þórður Guðjónsson and Björn Bergmann Sigurðarson are all also former Icelandic international footballers, while his paternal cousin, Jóhannes Bjarnason plays for KR. His maternal aunt, Magnea Guðlaugsdóttir, also represented Iceland at international level, and his maternal cousin, Oliver Stefánsson, plays for Breiðablik.

== Career statistics ==
=== Club ===
As of 17 May 2026.

Appearances and goals by club, season and competition
| Club | Season | League | | | National Cup (Note: Includes Icelandic Cup and Danish Cup) | | League Cup (Note: Includes Lengjubikarinn) | | Other | | Total | |
| Club | Season | Division | Apps | Goals | Apps | Goals | Apps | Goals | Apps | Goals | Apps | Goals |
|---|---|---|---|---|---|---|---|---|---|---|---|---|
| ÍA | 2022 | Besta deild karla | 1 | 0 | 0 | 0 | 0 | 0 | 0 | 0 | 1 | 0 |
| ÍA | 2023 | 1. deild karla | 8 | 2 | 2 | 0 | 5 | 1 | 0 | 0 | 15 | 3 |
| ÍA | Total | | 9 | 2 | 2 | 0 | 5 | 1 | 0 | 0 | 16 | 3 |
| Nordsjælland | 2023–24 | Danish Superliga | 0 | 0 | 0 | 0 | – | | 0 | 0 | 0 | 0 |
| Nordsjælland | 2025–26 | Danish Superliga | 2 | 0 | – | | – | | – | | 2 | 0 |
| Nordsjælland | Total | | 2 | 0 | 0 | 0 | – | | 0 | 0 | 2 | 0 |
| Career total | | | 11 | 2 | 2 | 0 | 5 | 1 | 0 | 0 | 18 | 3 |
