= GNK Dinamo Zagreb Academy =

Dinamo Zagreb II
- Full name: Građanski nogometni klub Dinamo Zagreb II
- Founded: 27 December 1967; 58 years ago
- Ground: Hitrec-Kacian
- Chairman: Zvonimir Boban
Home colours	Away colours	Third colours

GNK Dinamo Zagreb Academy, also known as Hitrec-Kacian (Croatian pronunciation: [xîtrets kâtsijaːn]), are the youth team of Dinamo Zagreb. The academy was founded on 27 December 1967. There are a total of ten age categories within the academy, the oldest being the juniors (under-19) and youngest the zagići II (under-8). They have produced many of the Croatia national team stars including Luka Modrić, Vedran Ćorluka, Eduardo, Robert Prosinečki and Zvonimir Boban.

== History ==
The first junior team was formed in 1945 and the coach was the famous Građanski Zagreb goalkeeper Maks Mihelčić. Soon after that, Márton Bukovi joined the youth squad as an expert coach, but left after two years following his disappointment with the disbanding of Građanski. The junior team won a treble in 1950 (Zagreb's, Croatian and Yugoslav championships) under the leadership of Mirko Kokotović.

In 1952 Branko Horvatek started training one of the best junior generations the club ever had. Some of the famous players that played in that generation were Dražan Jerković, Mladen Košćak, Marijan Kolonić and Mladen Klobučar. The decision to form the youth academy Hitrec-Kacian was brought on 27 December 1967 with Horvatek being elected as its first director. Apart from him, many other famous Croatian coaches worked with the generation that was very successful in the period of 1972–1974 in Yugoslav junior competitions. Some of them include: Zorislav Srebrić, Marko Jurić, Pero Dujmović, Vladimir Čonč, Ivan Đalma Marković, Mirko Belić, Rudolf Cvek and Zdenko Kobešćak.

== Honours ==
=== Domestics ===
Croatian football league system

- Croatian U-19 Prva HNL
  - Winner (10): 2000, 2001, 2002, 2003, 2009, 2010, 2011, 2016, 2018, 2019
- Croatian U-17 Prva HNL
  - Winner (17): 1992, 1999, 2000, 2002, 2003, 2006, 2008, 2009, 2010, 2011, 2013, 2014, 2015, 2016, 2017, 2018, 2019
- Croatian U-15 Prva HNL
  - Winner (10): 1997, 1998, 2002, 2004, 2005, 2007, 2010, 2015, 2016, 2017
- Croatian Cup U-19
  - Winner (7): 2000, 2001, 2003, 2004, 2008, 2012, 2013
- Croatian Cup U-17
  - Winner (4): 2014, 2015, 2016, 2017
- Croatian Cup U-15
  - Winner (3): 2015, 2016, 2018

Yugoslav football league system

- Yugoslav Championship U-19
  - Winner (5): 1950, 1955, 1972, 1973, 1974
- Croatian Championship U-19
  - Winner (17): 1950, 1951, 1954, 1955, 1963, 1966, 1967, 1968, 1972, 1973, 1974, 1976, 1979, 1980, 1983, 1984, 1986
- Croatian Championship U-17
  - Winner (2): 1959, 1985
- Yugoslav Cup U-19
  - Winner (2): 1967, 1973
- Croatian Cup U-19
  - Winner (5): 1963, 1967, 1968, 1973, 1978

==== Internationals ====
- FIFA Youth Cup
  - Winner (1): 2018
- Manchester United Premier Cup
  - Winner (1): 2012–13
- Premier League International Cup
  - Runners-up (1): 2018–19
  - Semi-finals (1): 2025-26
- UEFA Youth League
  - Quarterfinals (2): 2018–19, 2019–20
- Kvarnerska rivijera
  - Winner (11): 1961, 1967, 1977, 1981, 1984, 1986, 1999, 2008, 2019, 2023, 2026
- International Nereo Rocco Tournament
  - Winner (2): 2002, 2009

=== Modern times ===
After the formation of HNL in 1991. Dinamo youth teams play important role with 6 U19 and 9 U17 titles (as of 2010). Since the mid-2000s Dinamo's youth academy is considered one of the best in Europe with their teams winning notable international tournaments. Some of the former Dinamo youth players include Croatian internationals Vedran Ćorluka, Luka Modrić, Eduardo da Silva, Niko Kranjčar, Dejan Lovren, Milan Badelj, Ivan Kelava, Mateo Kovačić and Šime Vrsaljko.

=== Notable academy graduates ===
- (Croatia) Milan Badelj
- (Croatia) Igor Bišćan
- (Croatia) Zvonimir Boban
- (Croatia) Tomislav Butina
- (Croatia) Vedran Ćorluka
- (Croatia) Eduardo
- (Croatia) Joško Gvardiol
- (Croatia) Alen Halilović
- (Croatia) Ivan Kelava
- (Croatia) Mateo Kovačić
- (Croatia) Andrej Kramarić
- (Croatia) Niko Kranjčar
- (Croatia) Jerko Leko
- (Croatia) Dejan Lovren
- (Croatia) Luka Modrić
- (Croatia) Robert Prosinečki
- (Croatia) Zvonimir Soldo
- (Croatia) Dario Šimić
- (Croatia) Šime Vrsaljko
- (Croatia) Dino Drpić

== UEFA Youth League record ==
Season	Stage	Round	Opponent	Home	Away	Agg.
2015–16	Champions League Path	GS	(England) Arsenal	0–2	2–1	1st out of 4
2015–16	Champions League Path	GS	(Germany) Bayern Munich	0–1	2–1	1st out of 4
2015–16	Champions League Path	GS	(Greece) Olympiacos	2–2	3–1	1st out of 4
2015–16	Knockout stage	R16	(Belgium) Anderlecht		2–0	0–3 (awd.)
2016–17	Champions League Path	GS	(Italy) Juventus	2–1	1–0	4th out of 4
2016–17	Champions League Path	GS	(France) Lyon	1–2	0–2	4th out of 4
2016–17	Champions League Path	GS	(Spain) Sevilla	2–4	1–1	4th out of 4
2018–19	Domestic Champions Path	1R	(Romania) Viitorul Constanța	2–0	1–0	3–0
2018–19	Domestic Champions Path	2R	(Kazakhstan) Astana	3–1	1–1	4–2
2018–19	Knockout stage	PO	(Russia) Lokomotiv Moscow	1–1 (5–4 p)		
2018–19	Knockout stage	R16	(England) Liverpool	1–1 (4–3 p)		
2018–19	Knockout stage	QF	(England) Chelsea		2–2 (2–4 p)	
2019–20	Champions League Path	GS	(Italy) Atalanta	1–0	0–2	2nd out of 4
2019–20	Champions League Path	GS	(England) Manchester City	1–0	2–2	2nd out of 4
2019–20	Champions League Path	GS	(Ukraine) Shakhtar Donetsk	1–0	1–1	2nd out of 4
2019–20	Knockout stage	PO	(Ukraine) Dynamo Kyiv		0–0 (4–3 p)	
2019–20	Knockout stage	R16	(Germany) Bayern Munich		2–2 (6–5 p)	
2019–20	Knockout stage	QF	(Portugal) Benfica	1–3		
2020–21	Knockout stage	R64	(Norway) Rosenborg	Tournament cancelled		
2022–23	Champions League Path	GS	(England) Chelsea	4–2	0–4	3rd out of 4
2022–23	Champions League Path	GS	(Italy) Milan	1–2	0–3	3rd out of 4
2022–23	Champions League Path	GS	(Austria) Red Bull Salzburg	2–1	0–2	3rd out of 4
2023–24	Domestic Champions Path	1R	(Turkey) İstanbul Başakşehir	2–1	3–1	5–2
2023–24	Domestic Champions Path	2R	(Switzerland) Basel	0–0	0–2	0–2
2024–25	Champions League Path	LP	(Germany) Bayern Munich		1–2	21st out of 36
2024–25	Champions League Path	LP	(France) Monaco	1–0		21st out of 36
2024–25	Champions League Path	LP	(Austria) Red Bull Salzburg		2–3	21st out of 36
2024–25	Champions League Path	LP	(Slovakia) Slovan Bratislava		2–2	21st out of 36
2024–25	Champions League Path	LP	(Germany) Borussia Dortmund	0–0		21st out of 36
2024–25	Champions League Path	LP	(Scotland) Celtic	2–1		21st out of 36
2024–25	Knockout stage	R32	(Spain) FC Barcelona (youth)		2–2 (3–5) p	

== Players ==
=== GNK Dinamo Zagreb II ===
As of 11 September 2026

Note: Flags indicate national team as defined under FIFA eligibility rules; some limited exceptions apply. Players may hold more than one non-FIFA nationality.

No.	Pos.	Nation	Player
1	GK	SVN	Tai Žnuderl
2	DF	CRO	Noa Mikić
3	DF	CRO	Nikolas Šimić
4	DF	CRO	Borna Orlić
6	MF	CRO	Krešimir Radoš
7	FW	CRO	Mislav Ćutuk
8	MF	CRO	Tomas Baković
10	MF	SVN	Sven Šunta
11	FW	CRO	Patrik Horvat
12	GK	CRO	Petar Lončarević
13	DF	CRO	Petar Šimun Žaja
14	MF	CRO	Josip Brundić
15	DF	CRO	Nikola Radnić
16	FW	FRA	Noah Nsoki

No.	Pos.	Nation	Player
17	FW	CRO	Leonardo Perković
18	DF	CRO	Šimun Begović
19	FW	FRA	Ayoub Abdallah Makhfaoui
20	MF	BUL	Kaloyan Bozhkov
22	MF	CRO	Antonio Ćaćić
24	MF	BLR	Egor Molchan
25	MF	ESP	Aimar Rodriguez
26	FW	CRO	Gabrijel Šivalec
27	DF	CRO	Sven Lovrić
30	MF	GHA	Fuzy Taylor (on loan from Medeama)
31	MF	CRO	Jona Benkotić
34	MF	URU	Lautaro Ultra
44	DF	CRO	Fran Kasumović
77	FW	CRO	Karlo Zulfić
