= 2025–26 Sporting CP season =

Sporting CP
2025–26 season
- President: Frederico Varandas
- Head coach: Rui Borges
- Stadium: Estádio José Alvalade
- Primeira Liga: 2nd
- Taça de Portugal: Runners-up
- Taça da Liga: Semi-finals
- Supertaça Cândido de Oliveira: Runners-up
- UEFA Champions League: Quarter-finals
- Top goalscorer: League: Luis Suárez (28); All: Luis Suárez (38)
- Average home league attendance: 42,408
Home colours	Away colours	Third colours

The 2025–26 season was the 133rd season in the history of Sporting CP, and the club's 92nd consecutive season in the top flight of Portuguese football. In addition to the domestic league, the club participated in this season's editions of the Taça de Portugal, the Taça da Liga, the Supertaça Cândido de Oliveira, and the UEFA Champions League.

== Players ==
=== Current squad ===
As of 2 February 2026

Note: Flags indicate national team as defined under FIFA eligibility rules; some limited exceptions apply. Players may hold more than one non-FIFA nationality.

No.	Pos.	Nation	Player
1	GK	POR	Rui Silva
2	DF	BRA	Matheus Reis
5	MF	JPN	Hidemasa Morita
6	DF	BEL	Zeno Debast
7	FW	POR	Geovany Quenda
8	MF	POR	Pedro Gonçalves
10	FW	MOZ	Geny Catamo
11	DF	POR	Nuno Santos
12	GK	POR	João Virgínia
13	DF	GRE	Georgios Vagiannidis
14	MF	GEO	Giorgi Kochorashvili
15	FW	SEN	Souleymane Faye
17	FW	POR	Francisco Trincão
20	FW	URU	Maximiliano Araújo

No.	Pos.	Nation	Player
22	DF	ESP	Iván Fresneda
23	MF	POR	Daniel Bragança (vice-captain)
25	DF	POR	Gonçalo Inácio (3rd captain)
26	DF	CIV	Ousmane Diomande
31	FW	BRA	Luis Guilherme
41	GK	BRA	Diego Callai
42	MF	DEN	Morten Hjulmand (captain)
52	MF	POR	João Simões
72	DF	POR	Eduardo Quaresma
89	FW	GRE	Fotis Ioannidis
91	DF	POR	Ricardo Mangas
97	FW	COL	Luis Suárez
99	GK	POR	Francisco Silva

=== Other players under contract ===
Note: Flags indicate national team as defined under FIFA eligibility rules; some limited exceptions apply. Players may hold more than one non-FIFA nationality.

No.	Pos.	Nation	Player
32	MF	ARG	Mateo Tanlongo

== Transfers ==
=== In ===
Pos.	Player	Transferred from	Fee	Date	Source
Summer transfers
FW	(Brazil) Alisson Santos	(Brazil) Vitória	€2,100,000	30 June 2025	
GK	(Portugal) Rui Silva	(Spain) Real Betis	€4,000,000	1 July 2025	
MF	(Georgia (country)) Giorgi Kochorashvili	(Spain) Levante	€5,500,000	6 July 2025	
GK	(Portugal) João Virgínia	Unattached	Free	25 July 2025	
FW	(Colombia) Luis Suárez	(Spain) Almería	€25,000,000	31 July 2025	
DF	(Greece) Georgios Vagiannidis	(Greece) Panathinaikos	€13,000,000	6 August 2025	
FW	(Greece) Fotis Ioannidis	(Greece) Panathinaikos	€22,000,000	1 September 2025	
Disclosed total
€71,600,000

=== Out ===
Pos.	Player	Transferred to	Fee	Date	Source
Summer transfers
MF	(Portugal) Dário Essugo	(England) Chelsea	€22,270,000	2 June 2025	
GK	(Portugal) Diogo Pinto	(Portugal) Estrela da Amadora	Free transfer	25 June 2025	
GK	(Bosnia and Herzegovina) Vladan Kovačević	(England) Norwich City	€2,500,000	26 June 2025	
MF	(France) Koba Koindredi	(Switzerland) Basel	Loan	27 June 2025	
FW	(England) Marcus Edwards	(England) Burnley	€10,000,000	1 July 2025	
MF	(Greece) Sotiris Alexandropoulos	(Germany) Fortuna Düsseldorf	Loan	2 July 2025	
FW	(Sweden) Viktor Gyökeres	(England) Arsenal	€65,800,000	26 July 2025	
GK	(Uruguay) Franco Israel	(Italy) Torino	€4,500,000	27 July 2025	
FW	(Denmark) Conrad Harder	(Germany) RB Leipzig	€24,000,000	1 September 2025	
Disclosed total
€127,070,000

== Competitions ==
=== Overall record ===
Competition	First match	Last match	Starting round	Final position	Record							
Competition	First match	Last match	Starting round	Final position	Pld	W	D	L	GF	GA	GD	Win %
Primeira Liga	8 August 2025	16 May 2026	Matchday 1	2nd	34	25	7	2	89	24	+65	73.53
Taça de Portugal	18 October 2025	24 May 2026	Third round	Runners-up	7	5	1	1	14	8	+6	71.43
Taça da Liga	28 October 2025	6 January 2026	Quarter-finals	Semi-finals	2	1	0	1	6	3	+3	50.00
Supertaça Cândido de Oliveira	31 July 2025		Final	Runners-up	1	0	0	1	0	1	−1	0.00
UEFA Champions League	18 September 2025	15 April 2026	League phase	Quarter-finals	12	6	2	4	22	15	+7	50.00
Total					56	37	10	9	131	51	+80	66.07

Source: Soccerway

=== Primeira Liga ===
==== League table ====
Pos	Team	Pld	W	D	L	GF	GA	GD	Pts	Qualification or relegation
1	Porto (C)	34	28	4	2	66	18	+48	88	Qualification for the Champions League league phase
2	Sporting CP	34	25	7	2	89	24	+65	82	Qualification for the Champions League league phase
3	Benfica	34	23	11	0	74	25	+49	80	Qualification for the Europa League second qualifying round
4	Braga	34	16	11	7	64	36	+28	59	Qualification for the Conference League second qualifying round
5	Famalicão	34	15	11	8	42	29	+13	56	

Source: Liga Portugal
Rules for classification: 1) Points; 2) Head-to-head points; 3) Head-to-head goal difference; 4) Goal difference; 5) Matches won; 6) Goals scored; 7) Play-off.
(C) Champions

==== Results summary ====
Overall								Home						Away					
Pld	W	D	L	GF	GA	GD	Pts	W	D	L	GF	GA	GD	W	D	L	GF	GA	GD
34	25	7	2	89	24	+65	82	13	2	2	51	11	+40	12	5	0	38	13	+25

Source: Liga Portugal

==== Results by round ====
Round	1	2	3	4	5	6	7	8	9	10	11	12	13	14	15	16	17	18	19	20	21	22	23	24	25	26	27	28	29	30	31	32	33	34
Ground	A	H	A	H	A	H	A	H	A	H	A	H	A	H	A	H	A	H	A	H	A	H	A	H	A	H	A	H	A	H	A	H	A	H
Result	W	W	W	L	W	W	W	D	W	W	W	W	D	W	W	W	D	W	W	W	D	W	W	W	D	D	W	W	W	L	D	W	W	W
Position	6	1	1	3	2	2	2	2	2	2	2	2	2	2	2	2	2	2	2	2	2	2	2	2	2	2	2	2	2	3	3	3	2	2
Points	3	6	9	9	12	15	18	19	22	25	28	31	32	35	38	41	42	45	48	51	52	55	58	61	62	73	65	68	71	71	72	76	79	82

Source: Liga Portugal
A = Away; H = Home; W = Win; D = Draw; L = Loss; P = Postponed

==== Matches ====
8 August 2025 1	Casa Pia	0–2	Sporting CP	Rio Maior
20:15 WEST (UTC+01:00)		Report	Trincão 42'; Hjulmand 62'	Stadium: Estádio Municipal de Rio Maior; Attendance: 6,981; Referee: Gustavo Correia

17 August 2025 2	Sporting CP	6–0	Arouca	Lisbon
20:30 WEST (UTC+01:00)	Mangas 20', 50'; Suárez 31' (pen.), 62'; Trincão 45', 76'	Report		Stadium: Estádio José Alvalade; Attendance: 41,986; Referee: Hélder Malheiro

23 August 2025 3	Nacional	1–4	Sporting CP	Funchal
18:00 WEST (UTC+01:00)	Santos 3'	Report	Gonçalves 52', 76', 90+3'; Harder 83'	Stadium: Estádio da Madeira; Attendance: 4,394; Referee: Bruno Costa

30 August 2025 4	Sporting CP	1–2	Porto	Lisbon
20:30 WEST (UTC+01:00)	Pérez 74' (o.g.)	Report	De Jong 61'; Gomes 64'	Stadium: Estádio José Alvalade; Attendance: 50,946; Referee: João Gonçalves

13 September 2025 5	Famalicão	1–2	Sporting CP	Vila Nova de Famalicão
20:30 WEST (UTC+01:00)	Sá 17'	Report	Gonçalves 22'; Suárez 65'	Stadium: Estádio Municipal 22 de Junho; Attendance: 4,887; Referee: António Nobre

22 September 2025 6	Sporting CP	3–0	Moreirense	Lisbon
20:15 WEST (UTC+01:00)	Suárez 76' (pen.); Gonçalves 90' (pen.); Ioannidis 90+4'	Report		Stadium: Estádio José Alvalade; Attendance: 41,710; Referee: Hélder Carvalho

27 September 2025 7	Estoril	0–1	Sporting CP	Estoril
20:30 WEST (UTC+01:00)		Report	Suárez 12'	Stadium: Estádio António Coimbra da Mota; Attendance: 4,882; Referee: Luís Godinho

5 October 2025 8	Sporting CP	1–1	Braga	Lisbon
19:15 WEST (UTC+01:00)	Suárez 19'	Report	Zalazar 90+7' (pen.)	Stadium: Estádio José Alvalade; Attendance: 46,331; Referee: Cláudio Pereira

26 October 2025 9	Tondela	0–3	Sporting CP	Tondela
18:00 WET (UTC±00:00)		Report	Suárez 18'; Gonçalves 59'; Quenda 90+2'	Stadium: Estádio João Cardoso; Attendance: 4,519; Referee: José Bessa

31 October 2025 10	Sporting CP	2–0	Alverca	Lisbon
20:15 WET (UTC±00:00)	Ioannidis 68'; Gonçalves 74'	Report		Stadium: Estádio José Alvalade; Attendance: 31,833; Referee: António Nobre

8 November 2025 11	Santa Clara	1–2	Sporting CP	Ponta Delgada
19:30 AZT (UTC-01:00)	Lopes 5'	Report	Gonçalves 32'; Hjulmand 90+4'	Stadium: Estádio de São Miguel; Attendance: 5,970; Referee: João Gonçalves

30 November 2025 12	Sporting CP	4–0	Estrela da Amadora	Lisbon
18:00 WET (UTC±00:00)	Quaresma 7'; Suárez 11', 54'; Fresneda 25'	Report		Stadium: Estádio José Alvalade; Attendance: 43,722; Referee: Anzhony Rodrigues

5 December 2025 13	Benfica	1–1	Sporting CP	Lisbon
20:15 WET (UTC±00:00)	Sudakov 27'	Report	Gonçalves 12'	Stadium: Estádio da Luz; Attendance: 65,247; Referee: António Nobre

13 December 2025 14	Sporting CP	6–0	AVS	Lisbon
20:30 WET (UTC±00:00)	Suárez 32', 53'; Araújo 35', 47'; Catamo 37', 90+3'	Report		Stadium: Estádio José Alvalade; Attendance: 38,713; Referee: Iancu Vasilica

23 December 2025 15	Vitória de Guimarães	1–4	Sporting CP	Guimarães
20:45 WET (UTC±00:00)	Arcanjo 50'	Report	Trincão 32'; Ioannidis 42'; Araújo 79'; Castillo 63' (o.g.)	Stadium: Estádio D. Afonso Henriques; Attendance: 25,097; Referee: Miguel Nogueira

28 December 2025 16	Sporting CP	4–0	Rio Ave	Lisbon
20:30 WET (UTC±00:00)	Suárez 34', 60', 61'; Araújo 53'	Report		Stadium: Estádio José Alvalade; Attendance: 47,032; Referee: Carlos Macedo

2 January 2026 17	Gil Vicente	1–1	Sporting CP	Barcelos
20:45 WET (UTC±00:00)	Carlos Eduardo 87'	Report	Suárez 45'	Stadium: Estádio Cidade de Barcelos; Attendance: 8,956; Referee: Gustavo Correia

16 January 2026 18	Sporting CP	3–0	Casa Pia	Lisbon
20:15 WET (UTC±00:00)	Catamo 38', 43'; Bragança 78'	Report		Stadium: Estádio José Alvalade; Attendance: 34,975; Referee: David Rafael Silva

24 January 2026 19	Arouca	1–2	Sporting CP	Arouca
18:00 WET (UTC±00:00)	Barbero 48'	Report	Suárez 35', 90+6'	Stadium: Estádio Municipal de Arouca; Attendance: 3,142; Referee: Hélder Carvalho

1 February 2026 20	Sporting CP	2–1	Nacional	Lisbon
18:00 WET (UTC±00:00)	Gonçalves 72'; Suárez 90+6'	Report	Núñez 76'	Stadium: Estádio José Alvalade; Attendance: 39,984; Referee: Ricardo Baixinho

9 February 2026 21	Porto	1–1	Sporting CP	Porto
20:45 WET (UTC±00:00)	Fofana 77'	Report	Suárez 90+10'	Stadium: Estádio do Dragão; Attendance: 49,378; Referee: Luís Godinho

15 February 2026 22	Sporting CP	1–0	Famalicão	Lisbon
20:30 WET (UTC±00:00)	Bragança 82'	Report		Stadium: Estádio José Alvalade; Attendance: 46,164; Referee: David Rafael Silva

21 February 2026 23	Moreirense	0–3	Sporting CP	Moreira de Cónegos
18:00 WET (UTC±00:00)		Report	Trincão 52'; Catamo 56'; Suárez 75'	Stadium: Parque Moreira de Cóngeos; Attendance: 5,230; Referee: Bruno Costa

27 February 2026 24	Sporting CP	3–0	Estoril	Lisbon
20:45 WET (UTC±00:00)	Suárez 6', 16'; Bragança 90+4'	Report		Stadium: Estádio José Alvalade; Attendance: 46,112; Referee: Sérgio Guelho

7 March 2026 25	Braga	2–2	Sporting CP	Braga
18:00 WET (UTC±00:00)	Horta 34'; Zalazar 90+6' (pen.)	Report	Inácio 22'; Suárez 45+2' (pen.)	Stadium: Estádio Municipal de Braga; Attendance: 22,883; Referee: Miguel Nogueira

22 March 2026 27	Alverca	1–4	Sporting CP	Alverca do Ribatejo
18:00 WET (UTC±00:00)	Milovanović 83'	Report	Gonçalves 22', 86'; Suárez 50'; Catamo 68'	Stadium: Complexo Desportivo FC Alverca; Attendance: 6,664; Referee: João Pinheiro

3 April 2026 28	Sporting CP	4–2	Santa Clara	Lisbon
20:30 WEST (UTC+01:00)	Gonçalves 22' (pen.); Bragança 39'; Trincão 42'; Nel 90+6'	Report	Klismahn 3'; Paciência 89'	Stadium: Estádio José Alvalade; Attendance: 46,473; Referee: André Narciso

11 April 2026 29	Estrela da Amadora	0–1	Sporting CP	Amadora
20:30 WEST (UTC+01:00)		Report	Bragança 59'	Stadium: Estádio José Gomes; Attendance: 7,102; Referee: David Rafael Silva

19 April 2026 30	Sporting CP	1–2	Benfica	Lisbon
18:00 WEST (UTC+01:00)	Morita 72'	Report	Schjelderup 27' (pen.); Silva 90+3'	Stadium: Estádio José Alvalade; Attendance: 51,470; Referee: João Pinheiro

26 April 2026 31	AVS	1–1	Sporting CP	Vila das Aves
20:30 WEST (UTC+01:00)	Lima 66' (pen.)	Report	Nel 47'	Stadium: Estádio do CD Aves; Attendance: 3,567; Referee: Pedro Ramalho

29 April 2026 26	Sporting CP	2–2	Tondela	Lisbon
20:15 WEST (UTC+01:00)	Suárez 62'; Silva 79' (o.g.)	Report	Blopa 90+2' (o.g.); Alves 90+4'	Stadium: Estádio José Alvalade; Attendance: 32,836; Referee: Fábio Veríssimo

4 May 2026 32	Sporting CP	5–1	Vitória de Guimarães	Lisbon
20:15 WEST (UTC+01:00)	Inácio 9'; Bragança 23'; Araújo 45+3'; Suárez 61'; Luis Guilherme 74'	Report	Debast 85' (o.g.)	Stadium: Estádio José Alvalade; Attendance: 32,439; Referee: António Nobre

11 May 2026 33	Rio Ave	1–4	Sporting CP	Vila do Conde
20:15 WEST (UTC+01:00)	Bezerra 12'	Report	Suárez 35' (pen.); Mancha 42' (o.g.); Trincão 66'; Quenda 90'	Stadium: Estádio dos Arcos; Attendance: 3,747; Referee: João Gonçalves

16 May 2026 34	Sporting CP	3–0	Gil Vicente	Lisbon
20:30 WEST (UTC+01:00)	Quaresma 14'; Suárez 33'; Hjulmand 90+2'	Report		Stadium: Estádio José Alvalade; Attendance: 48,204; Referee: Luís Godinho

=== Taça de Portugal ===
18 October 2025 Third round	Paços de Ferreira	2–3 (a.e.t.)	Sporting CP	Paços de Ferreira
20:15 WEST (UTC+01:00)	Afonso 18'; João Victor 49'	Report	Gonçalves 22'; Ioannidis 61'; Ferreira 104'	Stadium: Estádio Capital do Móvel; Referee: Miguel Nogueira

22 November 2025 Fourth round	Sporting CP	3–0	Marinhense	Lisbon
18:00 WEST (UTC+01:00)	Trincão 29', 38'; Suárez 81'	Report		Stadium: Estádio José Alvalade; Referee: Ricardo Baixinho

18 December 2025 Fifth round	Santa Clara	2–3 (a.e.t.)	Sporting CP	Ponta Delgada
18:45 AZT (UTC-01:00)	Soares 28'; Silva 86'	Report	Simões 12'; Suárez 90+16' (pen.); Ioannidis 98'	Stadium: Estádio de São Miguel; Referee: João Pinheiro

5 February 2026 Quarter-finals	Sporting CP	3–2 (a.e.t.)	AVS	Lisbon
20:45 WET (UTC±00:00)	Luis Guilherme 29'; Paulo Vitor 49' (o.g.); Catamo 117'	Report	Lima 63' (pen.); Nenê 90+2' (pen.)	Stadium: Estádio José Alvalade; Attendance: 21,454; Referee: André Narciso

3 March 2026 Semi-finals; First leg	Sporting CP	1–0	Porto	Lisbon
20:45 WET (UTC±00:00)	Luis Suárez 62' (pen.)	Report		Stadium: Estádio José Alvalade; Attendance: 49,000; Referee: Cláudio Pereira

22 April 2026 Semi-finals; Second leg	Porto	0–0 (0–1 agg.)	Sporting CP	Porto
20:45 WEST (UTC+01:00)		Report		Stadium: Estádio do Dragão; Attendance: 47,450; Referee: Miguel Nogueira

24 May 2026 Final	Sporting CP	1–2	Torreense	Oeiras
17:15 WEST (UTC+1)	Luis Suárez 53'	Report	Zohi 3'; Stopira 112' (pen.)	Stadium: Estádio Nacional; Attendance: 33,799; Referee: António Nobre

=== Taça da Liga ===
28 October 2025 Quarter-finals	Sporting CP	5–1	Alverca	Lisbon
20:15 WET (UTC±0)	Quenda 21', 58'; Blopa 30', 70'; Ioannidis 81'	Report	Sandro Lima 85'	Stadium: Estádio José Alvalade; Attendance: 23,085; Referee: Bruno Costa

6 January 2026 Semi-finals	Sporting CP	1–2	Vitória de Guimarães	Leiria
20:00 WET (UTC±0)	Suárez 13'	Report	Ndoye 90+2', 90+11'	Stadium: Estádio Dr. Magalhães Pessoa; Attendance: 14,268; Referee: Luís Godinho

=== Supertaça Cândido de Oliveira ===
31 July 2025 Final	Sporting CP	0–1	Benfica	Faro/Loulé
20:45 WEST (UTC+1)		Report	Pavlidis 50'	Stadium: Estádio Algarve; Attendance: 19,354; Referee: Fábio Veríssimo

=== UEFA Champions League ===
==== League phase ====
The league phase draw was held on 28 August 2025.

Pos	Team	Pld	W	D	L	GF	GA	GD	Pts	Qualification
5	(Royal Spanish Football Federation) Barcelona	8	5	1	2	22	14	+8	16	Advance to round of 16 (seeded)
6	(The Football Association) Chelsea	8	5	1	2	17	10	+7	16	Advance to round of 16 (seeded)
7	(Portuguese Football Federation) Sporting CP	8	5	1	2	17	11	+6	16	Advance to round of 16 (seeded)
8	(The Football Association) Manchester City	8	5	1	2	15	9	+6	16	Advance to round of 16 (seeded)
9	(Royal Spanish Football Federation) Real Madrid	8	5	0	3	21	12	+9	15	Advance to knockout phase play-offs (seeded)

Source: UEFA
Rules for classification: League phase tiebreakers

Round	1	2	3	4	5	6	7	8
Ground	H	A	H	A	H	A	H	A
Result	W	L	W	D	W	L	W	W
Position	3	13	11	13	8	14	10	7

Source: UEFA
A = Away; H = Home; W = Win; D = Draw; L = Loss

18 September 2025 1	Sporting CP (Portugal)	4–1	(Kazakhstan) Kairat	Lisbon, Portugal
20:00 WEST (UTC+1)	Trincão 44', 65'; Alisson 67'; Quenda 68'	Report	Edmilson 86'	Stadium: Estádio José Alvalade; Attendance: 38,696; Referee: Damian Sylwestrzak (Poland)

1 October 2025 2	Napoli (Italy)	2–1	(Portugal) Sporting CP	Naples, Italy
21:00 CEST (UTC+2)	Højlund 36', 79'	Report	Suárez 62' (pen.)	Stadium: Stadio Diego Armando Maradona; Attendance: 47,364; Referee: Danny Makkelie (Netherlands)

22 October 2025 3	Sporting CP (Portugal)	2–1	(France) Marseille	Lisbon, Portugal
20:00 WEST (UTC+1)	Catamo 69'; Alisson 86'	Report	Paixão 14'	Stadium: Estádio José Alvalade; Attendance: 46,766; Referee: Rade Obrenović (Slovenia)

4 November 2025 4	Juventus (Italy)	1–1	(Portugal) Sporting CP	Turin, Italy
21:00 CET (UTC+1)	Vlahović 34'	Report	Araújo 12'	Stadium: Juventus Stadium; Attendance: 40,729; Referee: Daniel Siebert (Germany)

26 November 2025 5	Sporting CP (Portugal)	3–0	(Belgium) Club Brugge	Lisbon, Portugal
20:00 WET (UTC±0)	Quenda 24'; Suárez 31'; Trincão 70'	Report		Stadium: Estádio José Alvalade; Attendance: 41,634; Referee: Tobias Stieler (Germany)

9 December 2025 6	Bayern Munich (Germany)	3–1	(Portugal) Sporting CP	Munich, Germany
21:00 CET (UTC+1)	Gnabry 65'; Karl 69'; Tah 77'	Report	Kimmich 54' (o.g.)	Stadium: Allianz Arena; Attendance: 75,000; Referee: Nick Walsh (Scotland)

20 January 2026 7	Sporting CP (Portugal)	2–1	(France) Paris Saint-Germain	Lisbon, Portugal
20:00 WET (UTC±0)	Suárez 74', 90'	Report	Kvaratskhelia 79'	Stadium: Estádio José Alvalade; Attendance: 51,428; Referee: Anthony Taylor (England)

28 January 2026 8	Athletic Bilbao (Spain)	2–3	(Portugal) Sporting CP	Bilbao, Spain
21:00 CET (UTC+1)	Sancet 3'; Guruzeta 28'	Report	Diomande 12'; Trincão 62'; Alisson 90+4'	Stadium: San Mamés; Attendance: 52,065; Referee: Felix Zwayer (Germany)

==== Knockout phase ====
===== Round of 16 =====
The draw for the round of 16 was held on 27 February 2026 and Sporting were drawn to Bodø/Glimt.

11 March 2026 First leg	Bodø/Glimt (Norway)	3–0	(Portugal) Sporting CP	Bodø, Norway
21:00 CET (UTC+1)	Fet 32' (pen.); Blomberg 45+1'; Høgh 71'	Report		Stadium: Aspmyra Stadion; Attendance: 7,971; Referee: Ivan Kružliak (Slovakia)

17 March 2026 Second leg	Sporting CP (Portugal)	5–0 (a.e.t.) (5–3 agg.)	(Norway) Bodø/Glimt	Lisbon, Portugal
17:45 WET (UTC±0)	Inácio 34'; Gonçalves 61'; Suárez 78' (pen.); Araújo 92'; Nel 120+1'	Report		Stadium: Estádio José Alvalade; Attendance: 49,155; Referee: Sandro Schärer (Switzerland)

===== Quarter-finals =====
The draw for the quarter-finals was held on 27 February 2026, after the draw for the round of 16.

7 April 2026 First leg	Sporting CP (Portugal)	0–1	(England) Arsenal	Lisbon, Portugal
20:00 WEST (UTC+1)		Report	Havertz 90+1'	Stadium: Estádio José Alvalade; Attendance: 50,804; Referee: Daniel Siebert (Germany)

15 April 2026 Second leg	Arsenal (England)	0–0 (1–0 agg.)	(Portugal) Sporting CP	London, England
20:00 BST (UTC+1)		Report		Stadium: Emirates Stadium; Attendance: 58,249; Referee: François Letexier (France)

== Statistics ==
=== Appearances and goals ===
No.	Pos	Nat	Player	Total		Primeira Liga		Taça de Portugal		Taça da Liga		Supertaça Cândido de Oliveira		UEFA Champions League	
No.	Pos	Nat	Player	Apps	Goals	Apps	Goals	Apps	Goals	Apps	Goals	Apps	Goals	Apps	Goals
Goalkeepers
1	GK	(Portugal) POR	Rui Silva	48	0	32	0	3	0	1	0	1	0	11	0
12	GK	(Portugal) POR	João Virgínia	8	0	2	0	4	0	1	0	0	0	1	0
41	GK	(Brazil) BRA	Diego Callai	0	0	0	0	0	0	0	0	0	0	0	0
Defenders
2	DF	(Brazil) BRA	Matheus Reis	20	0	3+6	0	2+1	0	2	0	0	0	2+4	0
3	DF	(Netherlands) NED	Jerry St. Juste	0	0	0	0	0	0	0	0	0	0	0	0
6	DF	(Belgium) BEL	Zeno Debast	24	0	12+5	0	0+2	0	0	0	0+1	0	1+3	0
13	DF	(Greece) GRE	Georgios Vagiannidis	32	0	11+11	0	4	0	1	0	0	0	2+3	0
19	DF	(Portugal) POR	Diogo Travassos	0	0	0	0	0	0	0	0	0	0	0	0
20	DF	(Uruguay) URU	Maximiliano Araújo	46	7	24+4	5	4+1	0	1	0	1	0	11	2
22	DF	(Spain) ESP	Iván Fresneda	38	1	20+2	1	2+2	0	1	0	1	0	10	0
25	DF	(Portugal) POR	Gonçalo Inácio	45	2	28	2	5	0	0	0	1	0	11	0
26	DF	(Ivory Coast) CIV	Ousmane Diomande	30	1	14+2	0	3+1	0	0	0	1	0	7+2	1
43	DF	(Portugal) POR	João Muniz	1	0	0	0	0	0	0+1	0	0	0	0	0
47	DF	(Portugal) POR	Ricardo Esgaio	1	0	0	0	0	0	0	0	0+1	0	0	0
49	DF	(Brazil) BRA	Rômulo	2	0	0+1	0	0	0	0+1	0	0	0	0	0
70	DF	(Portugal) POR	Salvador Blopa	8	2	0+3	0	1+1	0	1	2	0	0	0+2	0
72	DF	(Portugal) POR	Eduardo Quaresma	31	2	13+3	2	6	0	2	0	0	0	5+2	0
91	DF	(Portugal) POR	Ricardo Mangas	23	2	11+4	2	3+2	0	1	0	0	0	1+1	0
Midfielders
5	MF	(Japan) JPN	Hidemasa Morita	50	1	22+9	1	5	0	1+1	0	1	0	4+7	0
8	MF	(Portugal) POR	Pedro Gonçalves	41	14	25+2	12	2+3	1	0	0	1	0	6+2	1
14	MF	(Georgia (country)) GEO	Giorgi Kochorashvili	26	0	5+13	0	2+1	0	1+1	0	0+1	0	1+1	0
23	MF	(Portugal) POR	Daniel Bragança	23	6	5+8	6	1+3	0	0	0	0	0	1+5	0
42	MF	(Denmark) DEN	Morten Hjulmand	44	3	25+1	3	6	0	1	0	1	0	10	0
52	MF	(Portugal) POR	João Simões	31	1	9+8	0	1+2	1	1	0	0	0	9+1	0
60	MF	(Brazil) BRA	Rayan Lucas	1	0	0	0	0	0	0+1	0	0	0	0	0
73	MF	(Portugal) POR	Eduardo Felicíssimo	1	0	0+1	0	0	0	0	0	0	0	0	0
Forwards
7	FW	(Portugal) POR	Geovany Quenda	33	6	7+14	2	2+2	0	1	2	0+1	0	5+1	2
10	FW	(Mozambique) MOZ	Geny Catamo	46	7	23+5	5	3+3	1	0	0	1	0	9+2	1
11	FW	(Portugal) POR	Nuno Santos	9	0	1+4	0	0+2	0	0	0	0	0	0+2	0
15	FW	(Senegal) SEN	Souleymane Faye	7	0	0+3	0	0+2	0	0	0	0	0	0+2	0
17	FW	(Portugal) POR	Francisco Trincão	53	12	31+2	6	6+1	2	1	0	1	0	11	4
27	FW	(Brazil) BRA	Alisson Santos	31	3	0+18	0	3	0	1+1	0	0	0	1+7	3
28	FW	(Portugal) POR	Rodrigo Ribeiro	3	0	0	0	1	0	0+1	0	0	0	0+1	0
31	FW	(Brazil) BRA	Luis Guilherme	18	2	6+6	1	2+2	1	0+1	0	0	0	1	0
58	FW	(Portugal) POR	Flávio Gonçalves	6	0	0+3	0	0+1	0	1+1	0	0	0	0	0
63	FW	(Ivory Coast) CIV	Chris Grombahi	1	0	0	0	0	0	0+1	0	0	0	0	0
89	FW	(Greece) GRE	Fotis Ioannidis	21	6	3+9	3	1+1	2	2	1	0	0	2+3	0
90	FW	(Portugal) POR	Rafael Nel	10	3	2+5	2	0	0	0	0	0	0	0+3	1
97	FW	(Colombia) COL	Luis Suárez	53	38	31+1	28	5+2	4	1	1	0+1	0	10+2	5
Players who transferred out during the season
9	FW	(Denmark) DEN	Conrad Harder	5	1	0+4	1	0	0	0	0	1	0	0	0

- Source: Soccerway
