= Alisson Santos =

Brazilian footballer (born 2002)

Personal information
- Full name: Alisson de Almeida Santos
- Date of birth: 27 September 2002 (age 24)
- Place of birth: Caatiba, Brazil
- Height: 1.77 m (5 ft 10 in)
- Position: Left winger

Team information
- Current team: Napoli
- Number: 27

Youth career
- 2018–2021: Vitória

Senior career*
Years	Team	Apps	(Gls)
2021–2025	Vitória	34	(2)
2023	→ Náutico (loan)	14	(1)
2024	→ Figueirense (loan)	23	(6)
2024–2025	→ União Leiria (loan)	16	(6)
2025–2026	Sporting CP	18	(0)
2026	→ Napoli (loan)	14	(4)
2026–	Napoli	3	(0)
- * Club domestic league appearances and goals as of 23:06, 245 September 2026 (UTC)

Alisson de Almeida Santos (born 27 September 2002), known as Alisson Santos or just Alisson, is a Brazilian professional footballer who plays as a left winger for Serie A club Napoli.

== Career ==
=== Vitória ===
Born in Caatiba, Bahia, Alisson joined Vitória's youth sides in 2018, aged 15. On 9 August 2019, he signed his first professional contract with the club, agreeing to a deal until July 2021.

Alisson made his first team debut on 5 May 2021, starting in a 1–1 Campeonato Baiano home draw against Fluminense. On 15 June, he further extended his contract until May 2025.

==== Loans to Náutico and Figueirense ====
Sparingly used in the following years, Alisson was loaned to Náutico on 7 March 2023. On 17 January of the following year, he was announced at Figueirense also in a temporary deal.

==== Loan to União de Leiria ====
On 29 August 2024, Alisson moved abroad after agreeing to a one-year loan deal with Liga Portugal 2 side União de Leiria; he also renewed his contract with Vitória until February 2028 prior to the move. In January, he scored three goals in four matches, being chosen as the Player of the Month by the players' sindicate.

On 31 March 2025, União announced Alisson's departure from the club.

=== Sporting CP ===
On 26 March 2025, Alisson began training with Sporting CP, after the club agreed to a transfer with Vitória. The Portuguese club agreed to pay € 2.1 million, effective the following 1 July.

He scored a goal in his UEFA Champions League debut in a 4–1 win over Kairat on 18 September 2025. On 28 January 2026, he scored a stoppage-time goal in a 3–2 victory over Athletic Bilbao, securing his club's place in the Champions League round of 16.

=== Napoli ===
On 2 February 2026, Alisson joined Serie A club Napoli on loan until the end of the 2025–26 season, as the Italian club paid a reported €3.5 million loan fee, while also keeping an optional buy-clause of €16.5 million. Later that month, on 15 February, he netted his first goal on his Serie A debut in a 2–2 draw with Roma.

On 5 June 2026, Napoli announced they had exercised Alisson's buyout clause.

== Personal life ==
Alisson is eligible for the Tunisia national team through his father, Ady (also known as Messias), who was also a footballer and played for Tunisia.

== Career statistics ==
As of match played 5 September 2026

Appearances and goals by club, season and competition
Club	Season	League			State league (Note: Includes Campeonato Baiano, Campeonato Pernambucano, Campeonato Catarinense)		National cup (Note: Includes Copa do Brasil, Taça de Portugal, Coppa Italia)		Continental		Other		Total	
Club	Season	Division	Apps	Goals	Apps	Goals	Apps	Goals	Apps	Goals	Apps	Goals	Apps	Goals
Vitória	2021	Série B	9	0	1	0	0	0	—		3 (Note: Appearances in Copa do Nordeste)	0	13	0
Vitória	2022	Série C	12	1	5	0	4	0	—		—		21	1
Vitória	2023	Série B	0	0	7	1	0	0	—		3	0	10	1
Vitória	Total		21	1	13	1	4	0	—		6	0	44	2
Náutico (loan)	2023	Série C	9	1	5	0	1	0	—		—		15	1
Figueirense	2024	Série C	12	4	11	2	—		—		—		23	6
União Leiria (loan)	2024–25	Liga Portugal 2	16	6	—		2	0	—		—		18	6
Sporting CP	2025–26	Primeira Liga	18	0	—		3	0	8 (Note: Appearances in UEFA Champions League)	3	2 (Note: Appearances in Taça da Liga)	0	31	3
Napoli (loan)	2025–26	Serie A	14	4	—		1	0	—		—		15	4
Napoli	2026–27	Serie A	3	0	—		0	0	0	0	—		3	0
Napoli	Napoli total		17	4	—		1	0	0	0	—		18	4
Career total			93	16	29	3	11	0	8	3	8	0	149	22
