= Mesloub =

Mesloub may refer to:

- Walid Mesloub, Franco-Algerian footballer
- Mezian Mesloub Soares, Franco-Portuguese footballer
