= Ady (footballer) =

Tunisian footballer (born 1973)

Personal information
- Full name: Adailton Pereira dos Santos
- Date of birth: 18 April 1973 (age 53)
- Place of birth: Caatiba, Brazil
- Height: 1.75 m (5 ft 9 in)
- Position: Midfielder

Senior career*
Years	Team	Apps	(Gls)
1993–1994	Poções		
1994–1996	Bahia	17	(2)
1996–1997	Santa Cruz		
1997–1998	Madureira		
1998	Goiás		
1998	Santos FC	14	(2)
1999–2000	Portuguesa	12	(2)
2000–2003	Espérance Tunis	8	(2)
2003	Al-Qadsiah	26	(4)
2003–2005	Alahly Tripoli		
2005–2007	TPS Turku	57	(18)
2008	JJK	25	(3)
2009–2010	MyPa	23	(2)
Total		150+	(28+)

International career
2001	Tunisia	2	(0)
- * Club domestic league appearances and goals

Adailton Pereira dos Santos (Arabic: أديلتون بيريرا دوس سانتوس ; born 18 April 1973), better known as Ady or Messias, is a former professional footballer who last played for MyPa in the Finnish Veikkausliiga.

Born in Brazil, he became a naturalized Tunisian citizen, and represented the Tunisia national football team.

== Club career ==
Ady started his career as a child, in the Arthur Leite stadium in his hometown. As a teenager, he started to be noted as a good soccer player in a local championship called Liga Desportiva Caatibense, and later, he moved with his agent's help to Itambé, Bahia, playing for the local soccer team. Later, he was hired by Poções soccer team to contest Bahia's state soccer championship. After a good performance in this competition, he signed a contract with Esporte Clube Bahia and then his career reached the national level.

He also played for the Santa Cruz, Madureira and Goiás Football Club. And then became part of Santos FC, in which he played 15 matches in the Brazilian Championship of 1998. In 1999, he transferred to the Portuguesa team, but it did not last long.

Little used in "Lusa do Canindé", he received a proposal from Tunisian football. He accepted, traveled and began his international career. With a solid career and notoriety at Espérance de Tunis, he became naturalized and played for the national team of that country, playing in the World Cup qualifiers and with the intention of playing in the 2002 FIFA World Cup, but ended up not being called up for the World Cup.

After leaving Espérance, Ady played for Al Ahly Tripoli in Libya from 2003 to 2005. In 2005, he started his career in Finland, playing for TPS until 2007; then at JJK Jyväskylä in 2008 and from 2009 to 2010 at MyPa, where he would end his career at the age of 37.

== International career ==
After playing for Espérance de Tunis for one year, he became naturalized and made two friendly appearances for Tunisia against Togo and Liberia with the intention of playing in the 2002 FIFA World Cup, but he ended up not being called up for the World Cup and ended his international career with two caps for Tunisia.

== Personal life ==
Ady's son Alisson Santos is also a professional footballer.
