= Portugal national under-21 football team =

National association football team

Portugal Under-21
- Nickname: Esperanças (Hopes)
- Association: Federação Portuguesa de Futebol
- Head coach: Luis Freire
- Captain: Mateus Fernandes
- Most caps: Manuel Fernandes (30)
- Top scorer: Hugo Almeida (16)
First colours	Second colours

First international
- Portugal 3–1 South Africa (Lisbon, Portugal; 16 November 1958)

Biggest win
- Portugal 11–0 Liechtenstein (Vizela, Portugal; 7 October 2021); Gibraltar 0–11 Portugal (Gibraltar; 14 October 2025)

Biggest defeat
- Italy 6–0 Portugal; Piacenza, Italy; 2 December 1987 Records for competitive matches only.

UEFA U-21 Championship
- Appearances: 11 (first in 1994)
- Best result: Runners-up (1994, 2015, 2021)

The Portugal national under-21 football team is the national under-21 football team of Portugal and is controlled by the Portuguese Football Federation (FPF). They are nicknamed "Esperanças". Esperança means hope, thus they are Portugal's hopes for the future.

Following the realignment of UEFA's youth competitions in 1976, the Portuguese under-21 team was formed. Until 1994, the team had a rather poor record, failing to qualify for each of the first eight UEFA under-21 Championships. Since 1994, the team has improved its record greatly, qualifying for five of the next seven tournaments, including the 2006 finals.

Having qualified for the 2006 tournament finals, UEFA announced that Portugal would host the finals in May and June. From 2007 onwards, host nations will be announced before the qualification stage and will not need to qualify.

== Competitive record ==
=== UEFA European Under-21 Championship ===
Year	Round	Position	Games	Won	Drawn	Lost	GF	GA
1978	did not qualify							
1980	did not qualify							
1982	did not enter							
1984	did not qualify							
1986	did not qualify							
1988	did not qualify							
1990	did not qualify							
1992	did not qualify							
(France) 1994	Runners-up	2nd	4	3	0	1	7	2
(Spain) 1996	Quarter-finals	7th	2	1	0	1	1	2
(Romania) 1998	did not qualify							
(Slovakia) 2000	did not qualify							
(Switzerland) 2002	Group stage	5th	3	1	1	1	4	4
(Germany) 2004	Third place	3rd	5	2	1	2	9	11
(Portugal) 2006	Group stage	6th	3	1	0	2	1	3
(Netherlands) 2007	Group stage	6th	4	1	2	1	5	2
(Sweden) 2009	did not qualify							
(Denmark) 2011	did not qualify							
(Israel) 2013	did not qualify							
(Czech Republic) 2015	Runners-up	2nd	5	2	3	0	7	1
(Poland) 2017	Group stage		3	2	0	1	7	5
(Italy) 2019	did not qualify							
(Hungary) (Slovenia) 2021	Runners-up	2nd	6	5	0	1	12	4
(Romania) (Georgia (country)) 2023	Quarter-finals		4	1	1	2	3	5
(Slovakia) 2025	Quarter-finals		4	2	1	1	9	1
(Albania) (Serbia) 2027								
Total	Runners-up	11/25	43	21	9	13	65	40

*Denotes draws include knockout matches decided on penalty kicks.
**Gold background colour indicates that the tournament was won.
***Red border color indicates tournament was held on home soil.

== Player records ==
=== Top appearances ===
As of 21 June 2025

Rank	Player	Club(s)	Year(s)	U-21 Caps
1	Henrique Araújo	Benfica, Watford, Famalicão, Arouca	2021–2025	32
1	Paulo Bernardo	Benfica, Paços Ferreira, Celtic	2021–2025	32
3	Manuel Fernandes	Benfica, Portsmouth, Everton, Valencia	2004–2008	30
4	Ricardo Quaresma	Sporting CP, Barcelona, Porto	2002–2006	28
4	Silvestre Varela	Sporting CP, Casa Pia, Vitória Setúbal	2004–2007	28
4	João Pereira	Benfica, Gil Vicente, Braga	2004–2008	28
4	Fábio Silva	Porto, Wolverhampton Wanderers, Anderlecht, PSV Eindhoven, Rangers, Las Palmas	2021–2025	28
8	Fernando Brassard	Marítimo, Gil Vicente, Vitória Guimarães	1991–1994	27
8	Hugo Almeida	Porto, União Leiria, Boavista, Werder Bremen	2002–2007	27
10	Ednilson	Roma, Benfica	2000–2003	26
10	Raul Meireles	Aves, Boavista, Porto	2003–2006	26

Note: Club(s) represents the clubs during the player's time in the Under-21s.

=== Top goalscorers ===
As of 21 June 2025

Rank	Player	Club(s)	Year(s)	U-21 Goals
1	Hugo Almeida	Porto, União Leiria, Boavista, Werder Bremen	2002–2007	16
2	Fábio Silva	Porto, Wolverhampton Wanderers, Anderlecht, PSV Eindhoven, Rangers, Las Palmas	2021–2025	15
3	Gonçalo Ramos	Benfica	2020–2022	14
3	Fábio Vieira	Porto, Arsenal	2019–2023	14
5	Henrique Araújo	Benfica, Watford, Famalicão, Arouca	2021–2025	13
6	Toni	Porto, Braga	1992–1994	12
6	Hélder Postiga	Porto, Tottenham	2001–2003	12
8	Paulo Bernardo	Benfica, Paços Ferreira, Celtic	2021–2025	11
9	Diogo Gonçalves	Benfica, Nottingham Forest	2017–2018	8
9	Paulo Costa	Alverca, Inter Milan, Reggina, Porto	2000–2002	8
9	Simão Sabrosa	Sporting CP, Barcelona	1998–2001	8
9	Diogo Jota	Paços Ferreira, Atlético Madrid, Porto, Wolverhampton Wanderers	2015–2018	8
9	Rui Fonte	Arsenal, Crystal Palace, Sporting CP, Vitória Setúbal, Espanyol	2008–2012	8

Note: Club(s) represents the clubs during the player's time in the Under-21s.

== Players ==
=== Current squad ===
Players born on or after 1 January 2004 are eligible for the 2027 UEFA European Under-21 Championship.

The following players were called up for the preparation match against England and Norway on 13 and 17 November respectively.

Caps and goals correct as of 17 November 2026, after the match against Norway.

No.	Pos.	Player	Date of birth (age)	Caps	Goals	Club
1	GK	Diogo Ferreira	10 February 2007 (age 19)	3	0	(Portuguese Football Federation) Benfica
12	GK	João Carvalho	9 April 2004 (age 22)	15	0	(Portuguese Football Federation) Braga
22	GK	João Afonso	30 April 2007 (age 19)	1	0	(Portuguese Football Federation) Porto
2	DF	Francisco Chissumba	29 May 2005 (age 21)	6	0	(Portuguese Football Federation) Alverca
4	DF	Tiago Gabriel (Vice-captain)	26 December 2004 (age 21)	11	0	(Italian Football Federation) Lecce
5	DF	Gonçalo Oliveira	4 July 2006 (age 20)	7	1	(French Football Federation) Stade Rennais
6	DF	Gabriel Brás (Vice-captain)	25 March 2004 (age 22)	10	2	(Royal Dutch Football Association) NEC
13	DF	Diogo Travassos	31 March 2004 (age 22)	10	2	(Portuguese Football Federation) Braga
15	DF	Tiago Parente	14 January 2004 (age 22)	8	2	(Portuguese Football Federation) Estoril
19	DF	Martim Fernandes	18 January 2006 (age 20)	4	0	(Portuguese Football Federation) Porto
24	DF	Afonso Silva	28 April 2004 (age 22)	1	0	(Polish Football Association) Wisła Płock
3	MF	Eduardo Felicíssimo	8 January 2007 (age 19)	2	0	(Portuguese Football Federation) Sporting CP
8	MF	João Simões	6 January 2007 (age 19)	6	1	(Portuguese Football Federation) Sporting CP
10	MF	João Rêgo	20 June 2005 (age 21)	2	0	(Portuguese Football Federation) Casa Pia
14	MF	Mathias De Amorim	10 December 2004 (age 21)	13	0	(Portuguese Football Federation) Famalicão
16	MF	Diogo Prioste	26 March 2004 (age 22)	2	0	(Portuguese Football Federation) Gil Vicente
20	MF	Gustavo Sá (Captain)	11 November 2004 (age 22)	17	2	(Hellenic Football Federation) Olympiacos
23	MF	Dário Essugo	14 March 2005 (age 21)	12	0	(French Football Federation) Strasbourg
7	FW	Mezian Soares	8 November 2009 (age 17)	4	1	(French Football Federation) Lens
9	FW	Rafael Nel	3 April 2005 (age 21)	5	0	(Portuguese Football Federation) Sporting CP
11	FW	Noah Saviolo	7 March 2004 (age 22)	4	0	(Turkish Football Federation) Trabzonspor
17	FW	Afonso Moreira	19 March 2005 (age 21)	8	2	(German Football Association) Bayer Leverkusen
18	FW	Rodrigo Ribeiro	28 April 2005 (age 21)	4	0	(German Football Association) FC Augsburg
21	FW	Mauro Couto	15 November 2005 (age 21)	2	0	(Portuguese Football Federation) Sporting CP

=== Recent call-ups ===
The following players have also been called up to the Portugal squad within the last twelve months and remain eligible to be called up.

Pos.	Player	Date of birth (age)	Caps	Goals	Club	Latest call-up
GK	Gonçalo Ribeiro	15 January 2006 (age 20)	1	0	(Portugal) Porto	v. Northern Ireland, 3 June 2026
GK	André Gomes	20 October 2004 (age 22)	1	0	(Portugal) Casa Pia	v. Czech Republic, 18 November 2025 ^{INJ}
DF	Rodrigo Rêgo	3 January 2005 (age 21)	5	1	(Spain) Castellón	v. England, 13 November 2026 ^{INJ}
DF	Daniel Banjaqui	24 March 2008 (age 18)	5	2	(Portugal) Benfica	v. England, 13 November 2026 ^{INJ}
DF	José Silva	20 August 2005 (age 21)	0	0	(Portugal) Gil Vicente	v. Gibraltar, 30 September 2026
DF	Diogo Monteiro	28 January 2005 (age 21)	1	0	(Portugal) Arouca	v. Northern Ireland, 3 June 2026
DF	João Costa	28 March 2005 (age 21)	1	0	(Saudi Arabia) Al-Ettifaq	v. Northern Ireland, 3 June 2026
DF	João Muniz	26 June 2005 (age 21)	9	0	(Portugal) Sporting CP	v. Scotland, 31 March 2026
DF	Leonardo Barroso	12 June 2005 (age 21)	2	1	(United States) Chicago Fire	v. Scotland, 31 March 2026
MF	Gonçalo Moreira	3 January 2006 (age 20)	4	2	(Portugal) Benfica	v. Czech Republic, 6 October 2025
MF	Diogo Sousa	20 January 2006 (age 20)	4	0	(France) Strasbourg	v. Czech Republic, 6 October 2025
MF	Mateus Fernandes (Captain)	10 July 2004 (age 22)	23	4	(England) Tottenham	v. Gibraltar, 30 September 2026
MF	Diego Rodrigues	24 May 2005 (age 21)	4	0	(Portugal) Braga	v. Scotland, 31 March 2026
MF	Miguel Nogueira	27 February 2005 (age 21)	0	0	(Portugal) Vitória Guimarães	v. Scotland, 31 March 2026
FW	Geovany Quenda	30 April 2007 (age 19)	16	7	(England) Chelsea	v. Czech Republic, 6 October 2025
FW	Rodrigo Mora	5 May 2007 (age 19)	9	5	(Italy) Roma	v. Czech Republic, 6 October 2025
FW	Carlos Forbs	19 March 2004 (age 22)	24	5	(Belgium) Club Brugge	v. Czech Republic, 6 October 2025
FW	Gustavo Varela	30 January 2005 (age 21)	7	4	(Italy) Monza	v. Czech Republic, 6 October 2025
FW	Flávio Gonçalves	30 May 2007 (age 19)	2	0	(Portugal) Sporting CP	v. Czech Republic, 6 October 2025
FW	Youssef Chermiti	24 May 2004 (age 22)	8	3	(Scotland) Rangers	v. Northern Ireland, 3 June 2026
FW	Roger Fernandes	21 November 2005 (age 20)	9	2	(Saudi Arabia) Al-Ittihad	v. Northern Ireland, 3 June 2026
FW	Mateus Mané	16 September 2007 (age 19)	2	0	(England) Wolverhampton	v. Scotland, 31 March 2026
FW	Fabio Baldé	20 July 2005 (age 21)	2	1	(France) Strasbourg	v. Czech Republic, 18 November 2025
^{SEN} Player withdrew from the squad due to a call-up to the senior squad.^{INJ} Player withdrew from the squad due to an injury.^{OTH} Player withdrew from the squad due to other reasons.^{PRE} Preliminary squad.

== Head coaches ==
As of 14 November 2017

Manager	Period	Record							
Manager	Period	G	W	D	L	GF	GA	GD	Win %
(Portugal) José Alberto Costa	–1993	12	8	1	3	22	10	+12	66.67
(Portugal) Nelo Vingada	1994–1996	22	14	5	3	33	14	+19	63.64
(Portugal) Jesualdo Ferreira	1996–2000	33	19	5	9	64	36	+28	57.58
(Portugal) Agostinho Oliveira	2000–2002	22	11	4	7	39	21	+18	50.00
(Portugal) Rui Caçador	2002	3	2	0	1	5	4	+1	66.67
(Portugal) José Romão	2002–2004	18	12	2	4	44	27	+17	66.67
(Portugal) Rui Caçador	2004	1	0	1	0	0	0	+0	0.00
(Portugal) Agostinho Oliveira	2004–2006	18	14	1	3	36	9	+27	77.78
(Portugal) José Couceiro	2006–2007	13	7	3	3	22	9	+13	53.85
(Portugal) Rui Caçador	2007–2009	27	15	4	8	54	22	+32	55.56
(Portugal) Oceano Cruz	2009–2010	12	6	2	4	17	12	+5	50.00
(Portugal) Rui Jorge	2010–2025	127	90	19	18	352	105	+247	70.87
(Portugal) Luis Freire	2025–Present	0	0	0	0	0	0	+0	—

== Honours ==
- UEFA Under-21 European Championship:

Runners-up (3): 1994, 2015, 2021

Third place (1): 2004

== See also ==
- Golden generation
