= João Simões (footballer, born 2007) =

Portuguese footballer

Personal information
- Full name: João Pedro Arnauth Barrocas Simões
- Date of birth: 6 January 2007 (age 19)
- Place of birth: Portimão, Portugal
- Height: 1.78 m (5 ft 10 in)
- Position: Midfielder

Team information
- Current team: Sporting CP
- Number: 52

Youth career
- 2014–2018: Portimonense
- 2018–2024: Sporting CP

Senior career*
Years	Team	Apps	(Gls)
2024–	Sporting CP B	10	(2)
2024–	Sporting CP	28	(1)

International career^{‡}
2021–2022	Portugal U15	6	(0)
2022–2024	Portugal U17	39	(5)
2024–2025	Portugal U19	9	(2)
2025–	Portugal U21	6	(1)
Medal record
Men's football
Representing Portugal
UEFA European Under-17 Championship
Runner-up	2024 Cyprus
- * Club domestic league appearances and goals as of 13:29, 10 October 2026 (UTC) ‡ National team caps and goals as of 21:44, 17 November 2026 (UTC)

João Pedro Arnauth Barrocas Simões (born 6 January 2007) is a Portuguese professional footballer who plays as a midfielder for Primeira Liga club Sporting CP.

== Club career ==
Born in Portimão, Algarve, Simões started his development at Portimonense and finished it at Sporting CP. On 11 February 2021, he signed a youth contract with the latter, agreeing to a professional one in February 2023.

Simões was promoted to the reserve team in the summer of 2024. He made his debut for the main squad on 22 November, as a substitute in a 6–0 win against Amarante in the fourth round of the Taça de Portugal.

Simões played his first match in the Primeira Liga on 14 December 2024, starting and featuring 80 minutes of the 3–2 home victory over Boavista. He scored his first goal in the competition the following 25 January in a 2–0 defeat of Nacional also at the Estádio José Alvalade, and finished the season with nine appearances for the champions (18 in all competitions including five in the UEFA Champions League); subsequently, he renewed his link until 2030.

== International career ==
Simões represented Portugal at the 2023 and 2024 UEFA European Under-17 Championships. In the latter edition of the tournament, he captained his side to the final where they lost 3–0 to Italy.

On 10 October 2025, aged 18, Simões earned his first cap for the under-21 side, in a 3–0 home win over Bulgaria in the 2027 UEFA European Championship qualifiers. He scored his first goal the following 27 March, closing the 4–0 victory in Azerbaijan in the same stage.

== Career statistics ==
As of match played 15 April 2026

Appearances and goals by club, season and competition
Club	Season	League			Taça de Portugal		Taça da Liga		Continental		Other		Total	
Club	Season	Division	Apps	Goals	Apps	Goals	Apps	Goals	Apps	Goals	Apps	Goals	Apps	Goals
Sporting CP B	2024–25	Liga 3	9	2	—		—		—		—		9	2
Sporting CP	2024–25	Primeira Liga	9	1	2	0	2	0	5 (Note: Appearances in UEFA Champions League)	0	0	0	18	1
Sporting CP	2025–26	Primeira Liga	18	0	3	1	1	0	10	0	0	0	32	1
Sporting CP	Total		27	1	5	1	3	0	15	0	0	0	50	2
Career total			36	3	5	1	3	0	15	0	0	0	59	4

== Honours ==
Sporting CP

- Primeira Liga: 2024–25
- Taça de Portugal: 2024–25

Portugal U17

- UEFA European Under-17 Championship runner-up: 2024
