= Dário Essugo =

Portuguese footballer (born 2005)

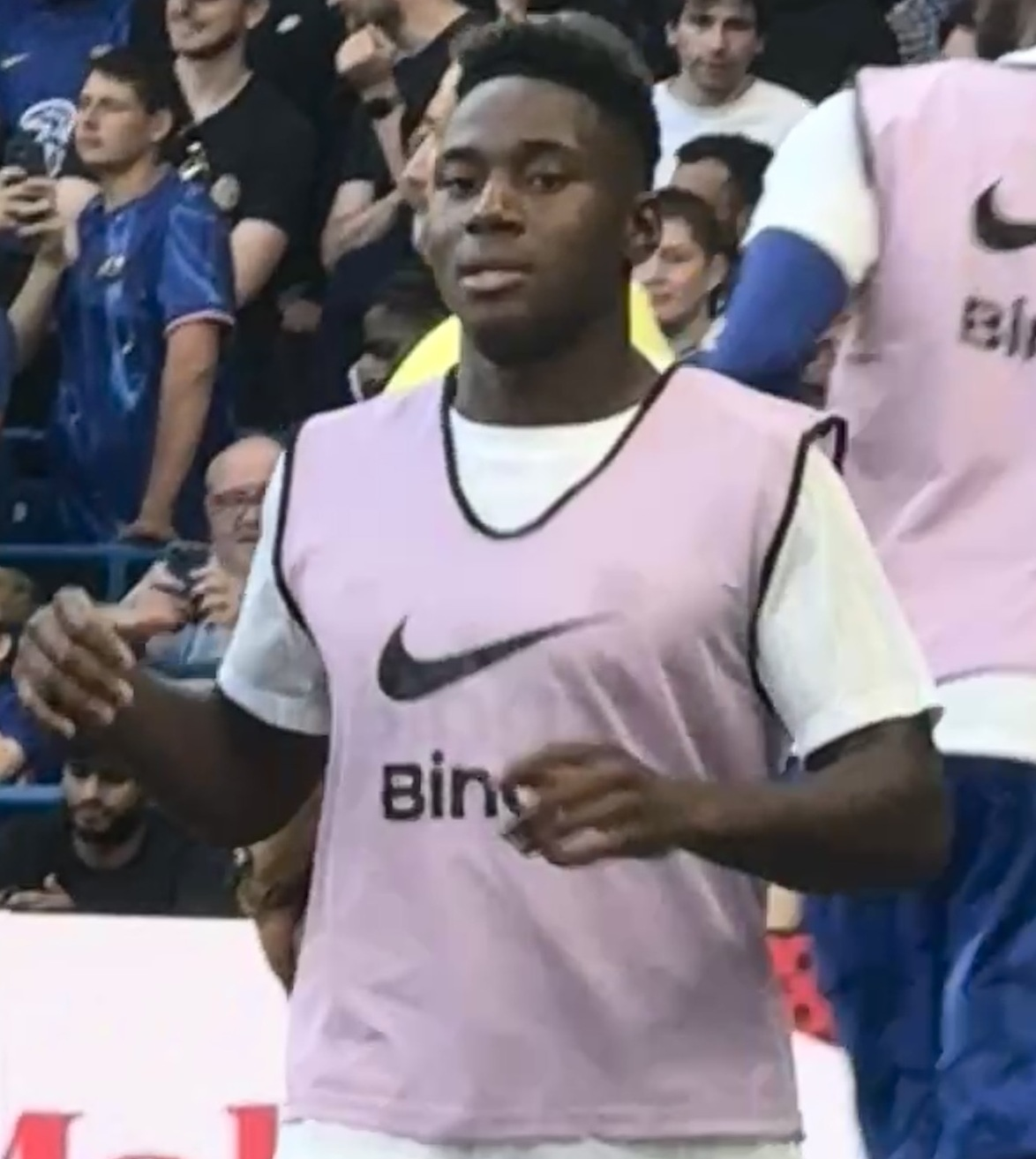
- Essugo with Chelsea in 2025

Personal information
- Full name: Dário Cassia Luís Essugo
- Date of birth: 14 March 2005 (age 21)
- Place of birth: Odivelas, Portugal
- Height: 1.80 m (5 ft 11 in)
- Position: Midfielder

Team information
- Current team: Strasbourg (on loan from Chelsea)
- Number: 14

Youth career
- 2013–2014: Santa Maria
- 2014–2022: Sporting CP

Senior career*
Years	Team	Apps	(Gls)
2021–2025	Sporting CP	12	(0)
2021–2023	Sporting CP B	27	(0)
2024	→ Chaves (loan)	14	(0)
2024–2025	→ Las Palmas (loan)	27	(1)
2025–	Chelsea	3	(0)
2026–	→ Strasbourg (loan)	7	(2)

International career^{‡}
2019	Portugal U15	5	(0)
2019	Portugal U16	9	(0)
2022	Portugal U17	5	(1)
2021	Portugal U18	2	(0)
2021–2024	Portugal U19	18	(0)
2022	Portugal U20	2	(0)
2023–	Portugal U21	12	(0)
- * Club domestic league appearances and goals as of 19:35, 3 November 2026 (UTC) ‡ National team caps and goals as of 21:44, 17 November 2026 (UTC)

Dário Cassia Luís Essugo (born 14 March 2005) is a Portuguese professional footballer who plays as a midfielder for Ligue 1 club Strasbourg, on loan from Premier League club Chelsea.

== Club career ==
=== Sporting CP ===
Essugo was born in Odivelas, Lisbon metropolitan area of Angolan descent, and joined Sporting CP's youth academy at the age of 9. On 16 March 2021 he signed his first professional contract and, four days later, before he had even appeared in a match for the junior, under-23 or reserve side, he made his debut in the Primeira Liga with the first team, coming on as a late substitute for João Mário in a 1–0 win against Vitória de Guimarães; at 16 years and 6 days, he became the youngest-ever debutant in the club's history.

On 7 December 2021, Essugo became Portugal's youngest player to debut in the UEFA Champions League, when he took the field in the second half of the 4–2 away loss to Ajax in the group stage aged 16 years and 268 days. He broke another club record the following 5 March, when he surpassed Luís Figo as the youngest starter at 16 years, 11 months and 17 days in a 2–0 home victory over Arouca.

On 31 January 2024, Essugo was loaned to fellow top-division Chaves until the end of the season. When it ended, he had been crowned national champion for the second time but also relegated.

Essugo was loaned to Las Palmas of the Spanish La Liga on 30 August 2024, being initially registered by the reserves. He made his league debut with the first team on 21 September, playing 74 minutes of the 2–1 away defeat against Osasuna. He scored his first goal on 23 November, but in a 2–3 home loss to Mallorca; his compatriot Fábio Silva, also recently signed, also found the net in that match.

On 24 January 2025, Essugo was sent off in the reverse fixture against Osasuna for two yellow cards, and sarcastically applauded referee Jesús Gil Manzano as he left the pitch. For his actions, he was handed a three-game ban five days later.

=== Chelsea ===
On 20 March 2025, Premier League club Chelsea signed Essugo for £18.5m. The transfer was made effective on 2 June ahead of the FIFA Club World Cup; both he and Geovany Quenda were acquired from Sporting, but Quenda remained one more season at the latter. He made his debut on 16 June, as a late substitute for Moisés Caicedo in the 2–0 win over Los Angeles FC in the World Cup group stage.

Essugo spent the vast majority of his debut season on the sidelines, due to a thigh injury. He only made his first competitive appearance on 7 March 2026, featuring 30 minutes plus extra time and providing two assists in a 4–2 away defeat of Wrexham in the round of 16 of the FA Cup.

On 1 September 2026, Essugo was loaned to Strasbourg.

== International career ==
Essugo represented Portugal at youth level. He was selected for the 2022 UEFA European Under-17 Championship in Israel, scoring in the quarter-finals against France (2–2 after 120 minutes, 6–5 penalty shootout loss).

Essugo won his first cap for the under-21 team at just 18, in a 3–0 win over Andorra in the 2025 European Championship qualifiers on 8 September 2023.

== Career statistics ==
As of match played 1 November 2026

Appearances and goals by club, season and competition
Club	Season	League			National cup (Note: Includes Taça de Portugal, FA Cup)		League cup (Note: Includes Taça da Liga)		Europe		Other		Total	
Club	Season	Division	Apps	Goals	Apps	Goals	Apps	Goals	Apps	Goals	Apps	Goals	Apps	Goals
Sporting CP	2020–21	Primeira Liga	1	0	0	0	0	0	0	0	—		1	0
Sporting CP	2021–22	Primeira Liga	1	0	0	0	0	0	1 (Note: Appearance in UEFA Champions League)	0	0	0	2	0
Sporting CP	2022–23	Primeira Liga	4	0	0	0	3	0	3 (Note: One appearance in UEFA Champions League, two appearances in UEFA Europa League)	0	—		10	0
Sporting CP	2023–24	Primeira Liga	4	0	3	0	2	0	1 (Note: Appearance in UEFA Europa League)	0	—		10	0
Sporting CP	2024–25	Primeira Liga	2	0	—		—		—		0	0	2	0
Sporting CP	Total		12	0	3	0	5	0	5	0	0	0	25	0
Sporting CP B	2021–22	Liga 3	15	0	—		—		—		—		15	0
Sporting CP B	2022–23	Liga 3	12	0	—		—		—		—		12	0
Sporting CP B	Total		27	0	—		—		—		—		27	0
Chaves (loan)	2023–24	Primeira Liga	14	0	—		—		—		—		14	0
Las Palmas (loan)	2024–25	La Liga	27	1	0	0	—		—		—		27	1
Chelsea	2024–25	Premier League	—		—		—		—		3 (Note: Appearances in FIFA Club World Cup)	0	3	0
Chelsea	2025–26	Premier League	3	0	2	0	0	0	0	0	—		5	0
Chelsea	Total		3	0	2	0	0	0	0	0	3	0	8	0
Strasbourg (loan)	2026–27	Ligue 1	7	2	0	0	—		—		—		7	2
Career total			90	2	5	0	5	0	5	0	3	0	108	2

== Honours ==
Sporting CP

- Primeira Liga: 2020–21, 2023–24, 2024–25

Chelsea

- FIFA Club World Cup: 2025
- FA Cup runner-up: 2025–26
