= Salvador Blopa =

Portuguese footballer (born 2007)

Personal information
- Full name: Salvador Uco Blopa
- Date of birth: 13 June 2007 (age 19)
- Place of birth: Cascais, Portugal
- Height: 1.88 m (6 ft 2 in)
- Positions: Winger; full-back

Team information
- Current team: Sporting CP B
- Number: 70

Youth career
- 2015–2017: GDR Fontainhas Cascais
- 2017–2025: Sporting CP

Senior career*
Years	Team	Apps	(Gls)
2025–	Sporting CP B	22	(2)
2025–	Sporting CP	5	(0)

International career^{‡}
2024–2025	Portugal U18	15	(3)
2025–	Portugal U19	6	(2)
- * Club domestic league appearances and goals as of 5 November 2026 ‡ National team caps and goals as of 18:25, 6 November 2025 (UTC)

Salvador Uco Blopa (born 13 June 2007) is a Portuguese professional football player who plays as a winger or as a full-back for Liga Portugal 2 club Sporting CP B.

== Club career ==
Blopa is a product of the youth academies of the Portuguese clubs GDR Fontainhas Cascais and Sporting CP. On 18 April 2024, he signed his first professional contract with Sporting until 2026, and was promoted to their reserves in the Liga 3. In his debut season with Sporting B he helped them earn promotion to the Liga Portugal 2.

On 28 October 2025 he debuted with the senior Sporting CP team in a 5–1 Taça da Liga win over Alverca where he scored a brace. On 14 December 2025, Blopa signed a contract renewal until 2030, which set his release clause at €80 million.

== International career ==
Born in Portugal, Blopa is of Bissau-Guinean descent. He is a youth international for Portugal, having played for the Portugal U19s since 2025.

== Career statistics ==
As of match played 23 December 2025

Appearances and goals by club, season and competition
Club	Season	League			National cup		League cup		Continental		Total	
Club	Season	Division	Apps	Goals	Apps	Goals	Apps	Goals	Apps	Goals	Apps	Goals
Sporting CP B	2024–25	Liga 3	6	0	—		—		—		6	0
Sporting CP B	2025–26	Liga Portugal 2	11	1	—		—		—		11	1
Sporting CP B	Total		17	1	—		—		—		17	1
Sporting CP	2025–26	Primeira Liga	1	0	2	0	1	2	2 (Note: Appearances in UEFA Champions League)	0	6	2
Career total			18	1	2	0	1	2	2	0	23	3
