= Rui Caçador =

Portuguese football manager

Personal information
- Full name: Rui Manuel dos Santos Caçador
- Date of birth: 29 October 1953 (age 73)
- Place of birth: Viseu, Portugal

Team information
- Current team: Portugal (coordinateur sportif)

Managerial career
- Years: Team
- 1984–1985: Maxaquene
- 1986–1987: Benfica U-19
- 1987–1988: Costa do Sol
- 1989–1991: Portugal U-20
- 1993–1996: Portugal (assistant manager)
- 1996–1996: Mozambique
- 1996–1998: Portugal U-21 (assistant manager)
- 1998–2001: Portugal (assistant manager)
- 2001–2002: Portugal U-20
- 2002–2002: Portugal (assistant manager)
- 2002–2005: Portugal U-20
- 2007–2009: Portugal U-21
- 2009-: Portugal (coordinateur sportif)

Rui Manuel dos Santos Caçador (born 29 October 1953) is a Portuguese football manager. He is without a club.

Rui Caçador has had many managed many clubs and national teams. He has had several roles in the national team, which include the Portuguese under-20 team — managing them on three occasions — the Portuguese under-21 team — managing them once — and assistant manager of Portuguese senior team, in which he served on three occasions.

Caçador has also managed Maxaquene, Benfica's under-19, Costa do Sol, and the Mozambican national team. As the Portuguese under-20 team manager, he discovered the talents of many Portuguese football legends, which include Rui Costa, João Pinto, Capucho, and Luís Figo.

== Honours ==
- Moçambola — 1985
- Mozambican Cup — 1988
