= Mezian Mesloub =

Portuguese footballer (born 2009)

Personal information
- Full name: Mezian Mesloub Soares
- Date of birth: 8 November 2009 (age 17)
- Place of birth: Martigues, France
- Height: 1.80 m (5 ft 11 in)
- Position: Midfielder

Team information
- Current team: Lens
- Number: 38

Youth career
- 2014–2016: FC Plœmeur
- 2016–2018: Lorient
- 2018–2026: Lens

Senior career*
Years	Team	Apps	(Gls)
2026–	Lens	5	(1)

International career^{‡}
2025	Portugal U16	3	(1)
2025	Portugal U17	5	(1)
2026–	Portugal U21	2	(0)
- * Club domestic league appearances and goals as of 17 October 2026 ‡ National team caps and goals as of 30 September 2026

Mezian Mesloub Soares (born 8 November 2009) is a professional footballer who plays as a midfielder for Ligue 1 club Lens. Born in France of Algerian and Portuguese descent, he plays for Portugal at youth level.

== Club career ==
=== Lens ===
Son of Algerian international and former Lens captain Walid Mesloub, he started his youth career at Lorient, before moving to Lens. A standout with Lens youth teams, he was first called in the pro squad by Pierre Sage in May 2026 at the age of 16. Mesloub made his professional debut with Lens in a 1–0 Ligue 1 win over Nantes on 8 May 2026, scoring and sending his team to the Champions League. Coming on for Abdallah Sima, Mesloub scored his first goal only 5 seconds after coming on, making him the fastest to score a goal in Ligue 1 on debut and the 7th youngest ever. He also became the third-youngest to score for Lens, after Richard Krawczyk in 1963 and Michel Margottin in 1960.

During the summer transfer window, Mesloub was heavily linked to a move to Portuguese side Benfica and Dutch side PSV Eindhoven, but chose to remain at his boyhood club and signed his first professional contract. On 10 September, he made his Champions League debut coming on as a substitute for Franjo Ivanović in a match against Slavia Prague. He became, at 16 years and 306 days old, the youngest player in Lens history to play in a Champions League match and the third-youngest player from a French club to appear in the competition, behind Rayan Cherki and Warren Zaïre-Emery. In stoppage time, his left-footed cross allowed Florian Thauvin to help Lens equalize, and ultimately win the match 3–2. He thus became, alongside Lamine Yamal, one of only two players under the age of 17 to provide an assist in the Champions League. Eight days later, he made his first start in Ligue 1 in a 2–1 away defeat to Monaco.

== International career ==
Born in France, of Portuguese descent through his mother (his grandfather, the singer Felizardo Soares, born in Portugal in 1959, moved to France in 1969) and of Algerian descent through his father, French-born Algerian international footballer Walid Mesloub, he was called up by France U16s in August 2024, but played for Portugal since May 2025 in the under-16 and under-17 youth national teams.

In September 2026, he received his first call-up to the under-21's. He made his under-21 debut on September 25, away against Bulgaria, coming on in the 88th minute, and scoring the equalizer in a 2–1 loss. Five days later, against Gibraltar, at 16 years, 10 months and 22 days old, he became the youngest-ever player to starter for Portugal's under-21 team, surpassing Geovany Quenda's record in 2024 at 17 years, 5 months and 11 days.

== Career statistics ==
As of match played 17 October 2026

Appearances and goals by club, season and competition
Club	Season	League			Coupe de France		Europe		Other		Total	
Club	Season	Division	Apps	Goals	Apps	Goals	Apps	Goals	Apps	Goals	Apps	Goals
Lens	2025–26	Ligue 1	1	1	—		—		—		1	1
Lens	2026–27	Ligue 1	4	0	0	0	2 (Note: Appearances in UEFA Champions League)	0	0	0	6	0
Career total			5	1	0	0	2	0	0	0	7	1

== Honours ==
Lens

- Trophée des Champions: 2026
