= Walid Mesloub =

Algerian professional footballer (born 1985)

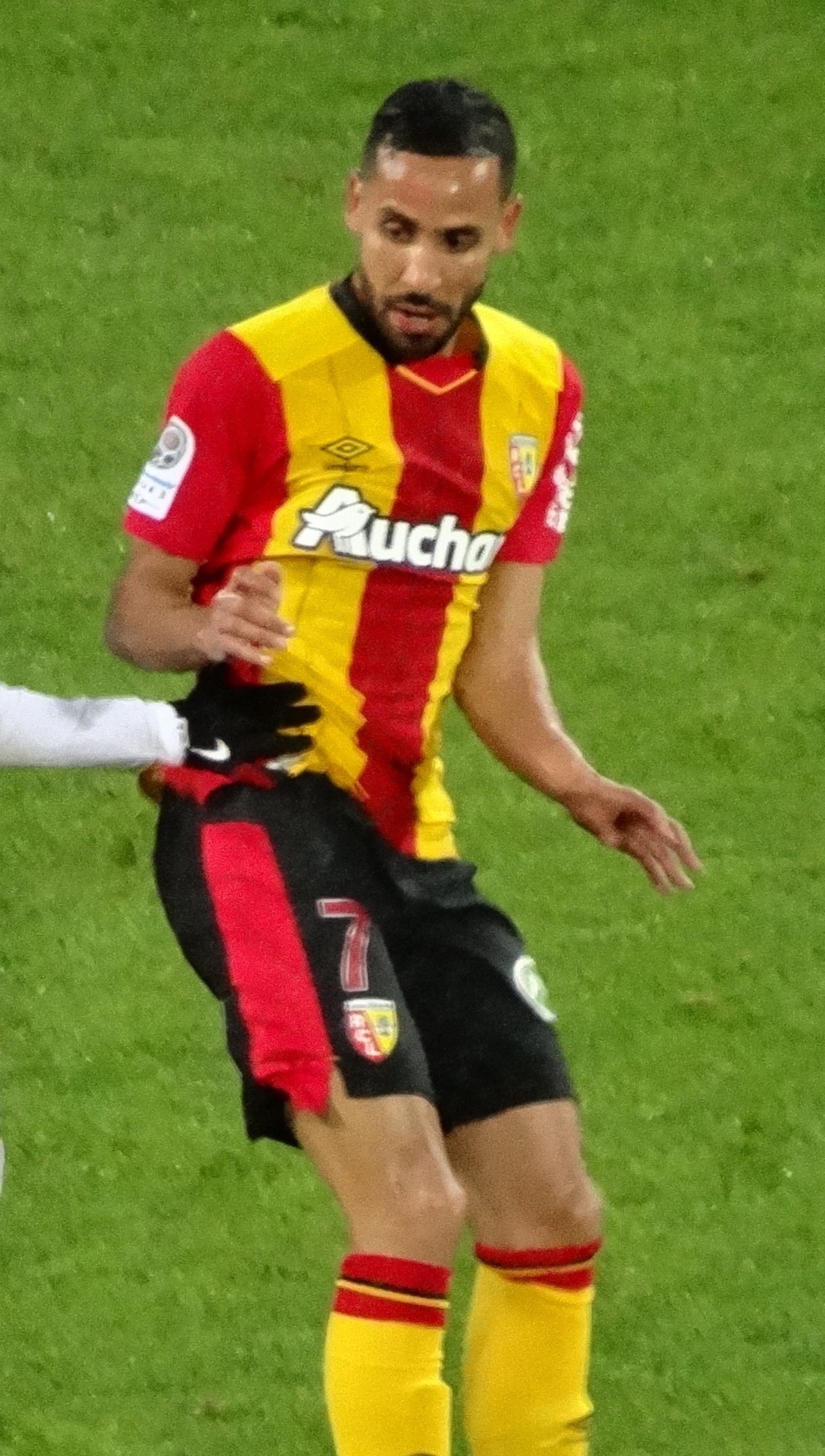

Personal information
- Full name: Walid Mesloub
- Date of birth: 4 September 1985 (age 41)
- Place of birth: Trappes, France
- Height: 1.76 m (5 ft 9 in)
- Positions: Midfielder; forward

Youth career
- Levallois

Senior career*
Years	Team	Apps	(Gls)
2006–2007	Levallois	32	(7)
2007–2010	Istres	88	(18)
2010–2014	Le Havre	155	(27)
2011	Le Havre B	1	(0)
2014–2018	Lorient	82	(1)
2018–2020	Lens	56	(7)
2020	Umm Salal	13	(0)

International career^{‡}
2010–2016	Algeria	7	(0)
- * Club domestic league appearances and goals as of 09:09, 27 August 2018 (UTC) ‡ National team caps and goals as of 20 November 2015

Walid Mesloub (born 4 September 1985) is a former professional footballer who played as a forward. Born in France, he played for the Algeria national team.

== Career ==
Born in Trappes, France, Mesloub joined Le Havre AC on 9 January 2010, on a 2 1/2-year contract. After four-and-a-half years in Le Havre, Mesloub joined Ligue 1 side FC Lorient in June 2014, signing a three-years contract.

== International career ==
On 25 October 2010, Abdelhak Benchikha, manager of the Algerian National Team, traveled to France to supervise Mesloub in the league game between Le Havre and Nîmes. Subsequently, on 30 October 2010, he was called up to Algeria's friendly against Luxembourg.

== Personal life ==
Mesloub's son Mezian Mesloub Soares is also a professional footballer.
