= 2025–26 UEFA Champions League knockout phase =

Europe premier club football tournament

The 2025–26 UEFA Champions League knockout phase began on 17 February with the knockout phase play-offs and ended on 30 May 2026 with the final at the Puskás Aréna in Budapest, Hungary, to decide the champions of the 2025–26 UEFA Champions League. Twenty-four teams competed in the knockout phase, with 16 entering in the play-offs and eight receiving a bye to the round of 16.

Times are CET/CEST, (Note: CET (UTC+1) for dates up to 28 March 2026 (knockout phase play-offs and round of 16), and CEST (UTC+2) for dates thereafter (quarter-finals, semi-finals and final).) as listed by UEFA (local times, if different, are in parentheses).

== Qualified teams ==
The knockout phase involved the top 24 teams that qualified from the league phase. The top 8 teams received a bye to the round of 16, while teams finishing in positions 9 to 24 entered the knockout phase play-offs.

Entering the round of 16 (seeded)
Pos	Team
1	(England) Arsenal
2	(Germany) Bayern Munich
3	(England) Liverpool
4	(England) Tottenham Hotspur
5	(Spain) Barcelona
6	(England) Chelsea
7	(Portugal) Sporting CP
8	(England) Manchester City

Entering the play-offs (seeded)
Pos	Team
9	(Spain) Real Madrid
10	(Italy) Inter Milan
11	(France) Paris Saint-Germain
12	(England) Newcastle United
13	(Italy) Juventus
14	(Spain) Atlético Madrid
15	(Italy) Atalanta
16	(Germany) Bayer Leverkusen

Entering the play-offs (unseeded)
Pos	Team
17	(Germany) Borussia Dortmund
18	(Greece) Olympiacos
19	(Belgium) Club Brugge
20	(Turkey) Galatasaray
21	(France) Monaco
22	(Azerbaijan) Qarabağ
23	(Norway) Bodø/Glimt
24	(Portugal) Benfica

== Format ==
Each tie in the knockout phase, apart from the final, was played over two legs, with each team playing one leg at home. The team that scored more goals on aggregate over the two legs advanced to the next round. If the aggregate score was level, then 30 minutes of extra time were played (the away goals rule was not applied). If the score was still level at the end of extra time, the winners were decided by a penalty shoot-out. In the final, which was played as a single match, if the score was level at the end of normal time, extra time was played, followed by a penalty shoot-out if the score was still level.

=== Draw procedure ===
In the knockout phase, there was no country protection, with teams from the same association able to face each other in any round. Teams could also face opponents they played during the league phase.

The mechanism of the draws for each round was as follows:

- In the draw for the knockout phase play-offs, the eight teams finishing the league phase in positions 9–16 were seeded, and the eight teams finishing the league phase in positions 17–24 were unseeded. The draw was split into four sections based on the predetermined bracket, with the seeded teams in each section drawn against one of their two possible unseeded opponents. The seeded teams hosted the second leg.
- In the draw for the round of 16, the eight teams finishing the league phase in positions 1–8 were seeded, and the eight winners of the knockout phase play-offs were unseeded. Again, the draw was split into four sections based on the predetermined bracket, with the seeded teams in each section drawn against one of their two possible unseeded opponents. The seeded teams hosted the second leg.

In the quarter-finals and semi-finals, both the exact match pairings and order of legs were predetermined based on the tournament bracket. The teams with the better league phase ranking played the second leg of each round at home if they continued advancing. Should a seeded team have been beaten, the team that eliminated them took over their seeding position. The winner of semi-final 1 was designated as the "home" team for the final (for administrative purposes, as it was played at a neutral venue).

In the knockout phase, teams from the same or nearby cities were not scheduled to play at home on the same day or on consecutive days, due to logistics and crowd control. To avoid such scheduling conflict, if the two teams were drawn to play at home for the same leg, the home match of the team that had the lower league phase ranking (if in the same competition) or the team playing in lower tier competition (Conference League) was moved from Thursday from a regularly scheduled time to an earlier time slot, to a different day, and/or at an alternative venue without clashing any other competition. However, a fixture reversal only applied if a team qualified to play the second leg at home decided to inform the UEFA administration before the draw to reverse the tie and play the first leg at home and not a second leg at an alternative venue.

=== Predetermined pairings ===
The bracket structure for the knockout phase was partially fixed in advance using seeding, with a symmetrical pattern on both sides. Teams' positions in the bracket were determined by their final standings in the league phase, ensuring that higher-ranked teams faced lower-ranked opponents in earlier rounds. As a result, certain sets of teams, such as the top two from the league phase, could not meet until the final.

The structure of each side of the bracket can be summarised as follows, with the exact pairings of the play-offs and round of 16 determined by a draw: (Note: The draws determined the exact play-off and round of 16 pairings for each side of the bracket, which mirrored each other. For example, if the team in 9th was drawn against 23rd in the play-offs, the team in 10th would be drawn against 24th on the other side of the bracket.)

- Knockout phase play-offs
  - Pairing I: 9/10 vs 23/24
  - Pairing II: 11/12 vs 21/22
  - Pairing III: 13/14 vs 19/20
  - Pairing IV: 15/16 vs 17/18
- Round of 16
  - Pairing A: 1/2 vs Winner IV
  - Pairing B: 3/4 vs Winner III
  - Pairing C: 5/6 vs Winner II
  - Pairing D: 7/8 vs Winner I
- Quarter-finals
  - Pairing 1: Winner A vs Winner D
  - Pairing 2: Winner B vs Winner C
- Semi-finals: Winner 1 vs Winner 2

== Schedule ==
The schedule was as follows (all draws were held at the UEFA headquarters in Nyon, Switzerland).

Round	Draw date	First leg	Second leg
Knockout phase play-offs	30 January 2026	17–18 February 2026	24–25 February 2026
Round of 16	27 February 2026	10–11 March 2026	17–18 March 2026
Quarter-finals	—N/a	7–8 April 2026	14–15 April 2026
Semi-finals	—N/a	28–29 April 2026	5–6 May 2026
Final	—N/a	30 May 2026 at Puskás Aréna, Budapest	

== Bracket ==
Knockout phase play-offs
21	(France) Monaco	2	2	4
11	(France) Paris Saint-Germain	3	2	5
20	(Turkey) Galatasaray (a.e.t.)	5	2	7
13	(Italy) Juventus	2	3	5
24	(Portugal) Benfica	0	1	1
9	(Spain) Real Madrid	1	2	3
17	(Germany) Borussia Dortmund	2	1	3
15	(Italy) Atalanta	0	4	4
22	(Azerbaijan) Qarabağ	1	2	3
12	(England) Newcastle United	6	3	9
19	(Belgium) Club Brugge	3	1	4
14	(Spain) Atlético Madrid	3	4	7
23	(Norway) Bodø/Glimt	3	2	5
10	(Italy) Inter Milan	1	1	2
18	(Greece) Olympiacos	0	0	0
16	(Germany) Bayer Leverkusen	2	0	2

Round of 16
11	(France) Paris Saint-Germain	5	3	8
6	(England) Chelsea	2	0	2
20	(Turkey) Galatasaray	1	0	1
3	(England) Liverpool	0	4	4
9	(Spain) Real Madrid	3	2	5
8	(England) Manchester City	0	1	1
15	(Italy) Atalanta	1	1	2
2	(Germany) Bayern Munich	6	4	10
12	(England) Newcastle United	1	2	3
5	(Spain) Barcelona	1	7	8
14	(Spain) Atlético Madrid	5	2	7
4	(England) Tottenham Hotspur	2	3	5
23	(Norway) Bodø/Glimt	3	0	3
7	(Portugal) Sporting CP (a.e.t.)	0	5	5
16	(Germany) Bayer Leverkusen	1	0	1
1	(England) Arsenal	1	2	3

Quarter-finals
11	(France) Paris Saint-Germain	2	2	4
3	(England) Liverpool	0	0	0
9	(Spain) Real Madrid	1	3	4
2	(Germany) Bayern Munich	2	4	6
5	(Spain) Barcelona	0	2	2
14	(Spain) Atlético Madrid	2	1	3
7	(Portugal) Sporting CP	0	0	0
1	(England) Arsenal	1	0	1

Semi-finals
11	(France) Paris Saint-Germain	5	1	6
2	(Germany) Bayern Munich	4	1	5
14	(Spain) Atlético Madrid	1	0	1
1	(England) Arsenal	1	1	2

Final
30 May – Budapest
11	(France) Paris Saint-Germain (p)	1 (4)
1	(England) Arsenal	1 (3)

== Knockout phase play-offs ==
The draw for the knockout phase play-offs was held on 30 January 2026, 12:00 CET.

=== Seeding ===
The draw was split into four seeded and four unseeded pots, based on the predetermined pairings for the knockout phase. Teams were allocated based on their final position in the league phase. Teams in positions 9 to 16 were seeded (playing the second legs at home), while teams in positions 17 to 24 were unseeded. The draw began with the unseeded teams, allocating them all to a tie. Once completed, all the seeded teams were drawn into a tie as their opponents.

9/10 vs 23/24		11/12 vs 21/22	
Seeded	Unseeded	Seeded	Unseeded
(Spain) Real Madrid; (Italy) Inter Milan	(Norway) Bodø/Glimt; (Portugal) Benfica	(France) Paris Saint-Germain; (England) Newcastle United	(France) Monaco; (Azerbaijan) Qarabağ

13/14 vs 19/20		15/16 vs 17/18	
Seeded	Unseeded	Seeded	Unseeded
(Italy) Juventus; (Spain) Atlético Madrid	(Belgium) Club Brugge; (Turkey) Galatasaray	(Italy) Atalanta; (Germany) Bayer Leverkusen	(Germany) Borussia Dortmund; (Greece) Olympiacos

=== Summary ===
The first legs were played on 17 and 18 February, and the second legs were played on 24 and 25 February 2026.

Team 1	Agg.	Team 2	1st leg	2nd leg
Monaco (France)	4–5	(France) Paris Saint-Germain	2–3	2–2
Galatasaray (Turkey)	7–5	(Italy) Juventus	5–2	2–3 (a.e.t.)
Benfica (Portugal)	1–3	(Spain) Real Madrid	0–1	1–2
Borussia Dortmund (Germany)	3–4	(Italy) Atalanta	2–0	1–4
Qarabağ (Azerbaijan)	3–9	(England) Newcastle United	1–6	2–3
Club Brugge (Belgium)	4–7	(Spain) Atlético Madrid	3–3	1–4
Bodø/Glimt (Norway)	5–2	(Italy) Inter Milan	3–1	2–1
Olympiacos (Greece)	0–2	(Germany) Bayer Leverkusen	0–2	0–0

=== Matches ===
17 February 2026
21:00

Monaco (France)	2–3	(France) Paris Saint-Germain
Balogun 1', 18'	Report	Doué 29', 67'; Hakimi 41'

Stade Louis II, Monaco
Attendance: 10,287
Referee: Jesús Gil Manzano (Spain)
25 February 2026
21:00

Paris Saint-Germain (France)	2–2	(France) Monaco
Marquinhos 60'; Kvaratskhelia 66'	Report	Akliouche 45'; Teze 90+1'

Parc des Princes, Paris
Attendance: 47,511
Referee: István Kovács (Romania)

Paris Saint-Germain won 5–4 on aggregate.

17 February 2026
18:45 (20:45 UTC+3)

Galatasaray (Turkey)	5–2	(Italy) Juventus
Sara 15'; Lang 49', 75'; Sánchez 60'; Boey 86'	Report	Koopmeiners 16', 32'

Rams Park, Istanbul
Attendance: 49,977
Referee: Danny Makkelie (Netherlands)
25 February 2026
21:00

Juventus (Italy)	3–2 (a.e.t.)	(Turkey) Galatasaray
Locatelli 37' (pen.); Gatti 70'; McKennie 82'	Report	Osimhen 105+1'; Yılmaz 119'

Juventus Stadium, Turin
Attendance: 41,421
Referee: João Pinheiro (Portugal)

Galatasaray won 7–5 on aggregate.

17 February 2026
21:00 (20:00 UTC+0)

Benfica (Portugal)	0–1	(Spain) Real Madrid
	Report	Vinícius 50'

Estádio da Luz, Lisbon
Attendance: 66,387
Referee: François Letexier (France)
25 February 2026
21:00

Real Madrid (Spain)	2–1	(Portugal) Benfica
Tchouaméni 16'; Vinícius 80'	Report	R. Silva 14'

Bernabéu, Madrid
Attendance: 76,745
Referee: Slavko Vinčić (Slovenia)

Real Madrid won 3–1 on aggregate.

17 February 2026
21:15 (Note: The Borussia Dortmund v Atalanta match, originally scheduled for 21:00, was delayed to 21:15 due to late team arrival caused by heavy traffic.)

Borussia Dortmund (Germany)	2–0	(Italy) Atalanta
Guirassy 3'; Beier 42'	Report

Westfalenstadion, Dortmund
Attendance: 76,900
Referee: Serdar Gözübüyük (Netherlands)
25 February 2026
18:45

Atalanta (Italy)	4–1	(Germany) Borussia Dortmund
Scamacca 5'; Zappacosta 45'; Pašalić 57'; Samardžić 90+8' (pen.)	Report	Adeyemi 75'

Stadio Atleti Azzurri d'Italia, Bergamo
Attendance: 21,234
Referee: José María Sánchez Martínez (Spain)

Atalanta won 4–3 on aggregate.

18 February 2026
18:45 (21:45 UTC+4)

Qarabağ (Azerbaijan)	1–6	(England) Newcastle United
Cafarguliyev 54'	Report	Gordon 3', 32' (pen.), 33', 45+1' (pen.); Thiaw 8'; J. Murphy 72'

Tofiq Bahramov Republican Stadium, Baku
Attendance: 28,861
Referee: Espen Eskås (Norway)
24 February 2026
21:00 (20:00 UTC+0)

Newcastle United (England)	3–2	(Azerbaijan) Qarabağ
Tonali 4'; Joelinton 6'; Botman 52'	Report	Durán 51'; Cafarguliyev 57'

St James' Park, Newcastle upon Tyne
Attendance: 50,068
Referee: Davide Massa (Italy)

Newcastle United won 9–3 on aggregate.

18 February 2026
21:00

Club Brugge (Belgium)	3–3	(Spain) Atlético Madrid
Onyedika 52'; Tresoldi 60'; Tzolis 89'	Report	Alvarez 8' (pen.); Lookman 45+4'; Ordóñez 79' (o.g.)

Jan Breydel Stadium, Bruges
Attendance: 25,235
Referee: Glenn Nyberg (Sweden)
24 February 2026
18:45

Atlético Madrid (Spain)	4–1	(Belgium) Club Brugge
Sørloth 23', 76', 87'; Cardoso 48'	Report	Ordóñez 36'

Metropolitano Stadium, Madrid
Attendance: 66,756
Referee: Clément Turpin (France)

Atlético Madrid won 7–4 on aggregate.

18 February 2026
21:00

Bodø/Glimt (Norway)	3–1	(Italy) Inter Milan
Fet 20'; Hauge 61'; Høgh 64'	Report	Esposito 30'

Aspmyra Stadion, Bodø
Attendance: 7,845
Referee: Daniel Siebert (Germany)
24 February 2026
21:00

Inter Milan (Italy)	1–2	(Norway) Bodø/Glimt
Bastoni 76'	Report	Hauge 58'; Evjen 72'

San Siro, Milan
Attendance: 70,441
Referee: Alejandro Hernández Hernández (Spain)

Bodø/Glimt won 5–2 on aggregate.

18 February 2026
21:00 (22:00 UTC+2)

Olympiacos (Greece)	0–2	(Germany) Bayer Leverkusen
	Report	Schick 60', 63'

Karaiskakis Stadium, Piraeus
Attendance: 32,300
Referee: João Pinheiro (Portugal)
24 February 2026
21:00

Bayer Leverkusen (Germany)	0–0	(Greece) Olympiacos
	Report

BayArena, Leverkusen
Attendance: 30,210
Referee: Michael Oliver (England)

Bayer Leverkusen won 2–0 on aggregate.

== Round of 16 ==
The draw for the round of 16 was held on 27 February 2026, 12:00 CET.

=== Seeding ===
As the bracket was fixed, the draw contained only four seeded pots, based on the predetermined pairings for the knockout phase, with the top-eight teams allocated based on their final position in the league phase. Teams in positions 1 to 8 were seeded (playing the second legs at home), while the bracket positions of the winners of the knockout phase play-offs (unseeded) were predetermined. The top-eight teams were drawn into the bracket against one of their two possible opponents.

1/2 vs 15/16/17/18		3/4 vs 13/14/19/20	
Seeded	Predetermined	Seeded	Predetermined
(England) Arsenal; (Germany) Bayern Munich	(Italy) Atalanta; (Germany) Bayer Leverkusen	(England) Liverpool; (England) Tottenham Hotspur	(Turkey) Galatasaray; (Spain) Atlético Madrid

5/6 vs 11/12/21/22		7/8 vs 9/10/23/24	
Seeded	Predetermined	Seeded	Predetermined
(Spain) Barcelona; (England) Chelsea	(France) Paris Saint-Germain; (England) Newcastle United	(Portugal) Sporting CP; (England) Manchester City	(Spain) Real Madrid; (Norway) Bodø/Glimt

=== Summary ===
The first legs were played on 10 and 11 March, and the second legs were played on 17 and 18 March 2026.

Team 1	Agg.	Team 2	1st leg	2nd leg
Paris Saint-Germain (France)	8–2	(England) Chelsea	5–2	3–0
Galatasaray (Turkey)	1–4	(England) Liverpool	1–0	0–4
Real Madrid (Spain)	5–1	(England) Manchester City	3–0	2–1
Atalanta (Italy)	2–10	(Germany) Bayern Munich	1–6	1–4
Newcastle United (England)	3–8	(Spain) Barcelona	1–1	2–7
Atlético Madrid (Spain)	7–5	(England) Tottenham Hotspur	5–2	2–3
Bodø/Glimt (Norway)	3–5	(Portugal) Sporting CP	3–0	0–5 (a.e.t.)
Bayer Leverkusen (Germany)	1–3	(England) Arsenal	1–1	0–2

=== Matches ===
11 March 2026
21:00

Paris Saint-Germain (France)	5–2	(England) Chelsea
Barcola 10'; Dembélé 40'; Vitinha 74'; Kvaratskhelia 86', 90+4'	Report	Gusto 28'; Fernández 57'

Parc des Princes, Paris
Attendance: 47,566
Referee: Alejandro Hernández Hernández (Spain)
17 March 2026
21:00 (20:00 UTC+0)

Chelsea (England)	0–3	(France) Paris Saint-Germain
	Report	Kvaratskhelia 6'; Barcola 15'; Mayulu 62'

Stamford Bridge, London
Attendance: 35,811
Referee: Slavko Vinčić (Slovenia)

Paris Saint-Germain won 8–2 on aggregate.

10 March 2026
18:45 (20:45 UTC+3)

Galatasaray (Turkey)	1–0	(England) Liverpool
Lemina 7'	Report

Rams Park, Istanbul
Attendance: 51,373
Referee: Jesús Gil Manzano (Spain)
18 March 2026
21:00 (20:00 UTC+0)

Liverpool (England)	4–0	(Turkey) Galatasaray
Szoboszlai 25'; Ekitike 51'; Gravenberch 53'; Salah 62'	Report

Anfield, Liverpool
Attendance: 59,980
Referee: Paweł Raczkowski (Poland)

Liverpool won 4–1 on aggregate.

11 March 2026
21:00

Real Madrid (Spain)	3–0	(England) Manchester City
Valverde 20', 27', 42'	Report

Bernabéu, Madrid
Attendance: 76,066
Referee: Maurizio Mariani (Italy)
17 March 2026
21:00 (20:00 UTC+0)

Manchester City (England)	1–2	(Spain) Real Madrid
Haaland 41'	Report	Vinícius 22' (pen.), 90+3'

City of Manchester Stadium, Manchester
Attendance: 51,103
Referee: Clément Turpin (France)

Real Madrid won 5–1 on aggregate.

10 March 2026
21:00

Atalanta (Italy)	1–6	(Germany) Bayern Munich
Pašalić 90+3'	Report	Stanišić 12'; Olise 22', 64'; Gnabry 25'; Jackson 52'; Musiala 67'

Stadio Atleti Azzurri d'Italia, Bergamo
Attendance: 22,557
Referee: Espen Eskås (Norway)
18 March 2026
21:00

Bayern Munich (Germany)	4–1	(Italy) Atalanta
Kane 25' (pen.), 54'; Karl 56'; Díaz 70'	Report	Samardžić 85'

Allianz Arena, Munich
Attendance: 75,000
Referee: Benoît Bastien (France)

Bayern Munich won 10–2 on aggregate.

10 March 2026
21:00 (20:00 UTC+0)

Newcastle United (England)	1–1	(Spain) Barcelona
Barnes 86'	Report	Yamal 90+6' (pen.)

St James' Park, Newcastle upon Tyne
Attendance: 52,103
Referee: Marco Guida (Italy)
18 March 2026
18:45

Barcelona (Spain)	7–2	(England) Newcastle United
Raphinha 6', 72'; Bernal 18'; Yamal 45+7' (pen.); López 51'; Lewandowski 56', 61'	Report	Elanga 15', 28'

Camp Nou, Barcelona
Attendance: 56,662
Referee: François Letexier (France)

Barcelona won 8–3 on aggregate.

10 March 2026
21:00

Atlético Madrid (Spain)	5–2	(England) Tottenham Hotspur
Llorente 6'; Griezmann 14'; Alvarez 15', 55'; Le Normand 22'	Report	Porro 26'; Solanke 76'

Metropolitano Stadium, Madrid
Attendance: 64,168
Referee: Serdar Gözübüyük (Netherlands)
18 March 2026
21:00 (20:00 UTC+0)

Tottenham Hotspur (England)	3–2	(Spain) Atlético Madrid
Kolo Muani 30'; Simons 52', 90' (pen.)	Report	Alvarez 47'; Hancko 75'

Tottenham Hotspur Stadium, London
Attendance: 49,568
Referee: Daniel Siebert (Germany)

Atlético Madrid won 7–5 on aggregate.

11 March 2026
21:00

Bodø/Glimt (Norway)	3–0	(Portugal) Sporting CP
Fet 32' (pen.); Blomberg 45+1'; Høgh 71'	Report

Aspmyra Stadion, Bodø
Attendance: 7,971
Referee: Ivan Kružliak (Slovakia)
17 March 2026
18:45 (17:45 UTC+0)

Sporting CP (Portugal)	5–0 (a.e.t.)	(Norway) Bodø/Glimt
Inácio 34'; Gonçalves 61'; Suárez 78' (pen.); Araújo 92'; Nel 120+1'	Report

Estádio José Alvalade, Lisbon
Attendance: 49,155
Referee: Sandro Schärer (Switzerland)

Sporting CP won 5–3 on aggregate.

11 March 2026
18:45

Bayer Leverkusen (Germany)	1–1	(England) Arsenal
Andrich 46'	Report	Havertz 89' (pen.)

BayArena, Leverkusen
Attendance: 30,210
Referee: Halil Umut Meler (Turkey)
17 March 2026
21:00 (20:00 UTC+0)

Arsenal (England)	2–0	(Germany) Bayer Leverkusen
Eze 36'; Rice 63'	Report

Emirates Stadium, London
Attendance: 57,537
Referee: Danny Makkelie (Netherlands)

Arsenal won 3–1 on aggregate.

== Quarter-finals ==
=== Summary ===
The first legs were played on 7 and 8 April, and the second legs were played on 14 and 15 April 2026.

Team 1	Agg.	Team 2	1st leg	2nd leg
Paris Saint-Germain (France)	4–0	(England) Liverpool	2–0	2–0
Real Madrid (Spain)	4–6	(Germany) Bayern Munich	1–2	3–4
Barcelona (Spain)	2–3	(Spain) Atlético Madrid	0–2	2–1
Sporting CP (Portugal)	0–1	(England) Arsenal	0–1	0–0

=== Matches ===
8 April 2026
21:00

Paris Saint-Germain (France)	2–0	(England) Liverpool
Doué 11'; Kvaratskhelia 65'	Report

Parc des Princes, Paris
Attendance: 47,511
Referee: José María Sánchez Martínez (Spain)
14 April 2026
21:00 (20:00 UTC+1)

Liverpool (England)	0–2	(France) Paris Saint-Germain
	Report	Dembélé 72', 90+1'

Anfield, Liverpool
Attendance: 59,627
Referee: Maurizio Mariani (Italy)

Paris Saint-Germain won 4–0 on aggregate.

7 April 2026
21:00

Real Madrid (Spain)	1–2	(Germany) Bayern Munich
Mbappé 74'	Report	Díaz 41'; Kane 46'

Bernabéu, Madrid
Attendance: 77,106
Referee: Michael Oliver (England)
15 April 2026
21:00

Bayern Munich (Germany)	4–3	(Spain) Real Madrid
Pavlović 6'; Kane 38'; Díaz 89'; Olise 90+4'	Report	Güler 1', 29'; Mbappé 42'

Allianz Arena, Munich
Attendance: 75,000
Referee: Slavko Vinčić (Slovenia)

Bayern Munich won 6–4 on aggregate.

8 April 2026
21:00

Barcelona (Spain)	0–2	(Spain) Atlético Madrid
	Report	Alvarez 45'; Sørloth 70'

Camp Nou, Barcelona
Attendance: 59,522
Referee: István Kovács (Romania)
14 April 2026
21:00

Atlético Madrid (Spain)	1–2	(Spain) Barcelona
Lookman 31'	Report	Yamal 4'; Torres 24'

Metropolitano Stadium, Madrid
Attendance: 69,268
Referee: Clément Turpin (France)

Atlético Madrid won 3–2 on aggregate.

7 April 2026
21:00 (20:00 UTC+1)

Sporting CP (Portugal)	0–1	(England) Arsenal
	Report	Havertz 90+1'

Estádio José Alvalade, Lisbon
Attendance: 50,804
Referee: Daniel Siebert (Germany)
15 April 2026
21:00 (20:00 UTC+1)

Arsenal (England)	0–0	(Portugal) Sporting CP
	Report

Emirates Stadium, London
Attendance: 58,249
Referee: François Letexier (France)

Arsenal won 1–0 on aggregate.

== Semi-finals ==
=== Summary ===
The first legs were played on 28 and 29 April, and the second legs were played on 5 and 6 May 2026.

Team 1	Agg.	Team 2	1st leg	2nd leg
Paris Saint-Germain (France)	6–5	(Germany) Bayern Munich	5–4	1–1
Atlético Madrid (Spain)	1–2	(England) Arsenal	1–1	0–1

=== Matches ===
28 April 2026
21:00

Paris Saint-Germain (France)	5–4	(Germany) Bayern Munich
Kvaratskhelia 24', 56'; Neves 33'; Dembélé 45+5' (pen.), 58'	Report	Kane 17' (pen.); Olise 41'; Upamecano 65'; Díaz 68'

Parc des Princes, Paris
Attendance: 47,511
Referee: Sandro Schärer (Switzerland)
6 May 2026
21:00

Bayern Munich (Germany)	1–1	(France) Paris Saint-Germain
Kane 90+4'	Report	Dembélé 3'

Allianz Arena, Munich
Attendance: 75,000
Referee: João Pinheiro (Portugal)

Paris Saint-Germain won 6–5 on aggregate.

29 April 2026
21:00

Atlético Madrid (Spain)	1–1	(England) Arsenal
Alvarez 56' (pen.)	Report	Gyökeres 44' (pen.)

Metropolitano Stadium, Madrid
Attendance: 68,421
Referee: Danny Makkelie (Netherlands)
5 May 2026
21:00 (20:00 UTC+1)

Arsenal (England)	1–0	(Spain) Atlético Madrid
Saka 45'	Report

Emirates Stadium, London
Attendance: 58,874
Referee: Daniel Siebert (Germany)

Arsenal won 2–1 on aggregate.

== Final ==
The final was played on 30 May 2026 at the Puskás Aréna in Budapest. The winner of semi-final 1 was designated as the "home" team for administrative purposes.

30 May 2026
18:00

Paris Saint-Germain (French Football Federation)	1–1 (a.e.t.)	(The Football Association) Arsenal
Dembélé 65' (pen.)	Report	Havertz 6'
Penalties
Ramos (penalty scored); Doué (penalty scored); Mendes (penalty missed); Hakimi (penalty scored); Beraldo (penalty scored)	4–3	(penalty scored) Gyökeres; (penalty missed) Eze; (penalty scored) Rice; (penalty scored) Martinelli; (penalty missed) Gabriel

Puskás Aréna, Budapest
Attendance: 61,035
Referee: Daniel Siebert (Germany)
