= Caatiba =

Municipality of Bahia, Brazil

Coordinates: 15°00′S 40°24′W

- Municipality
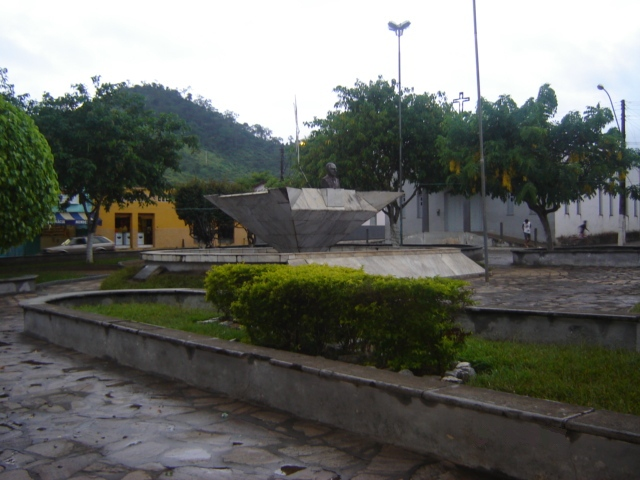

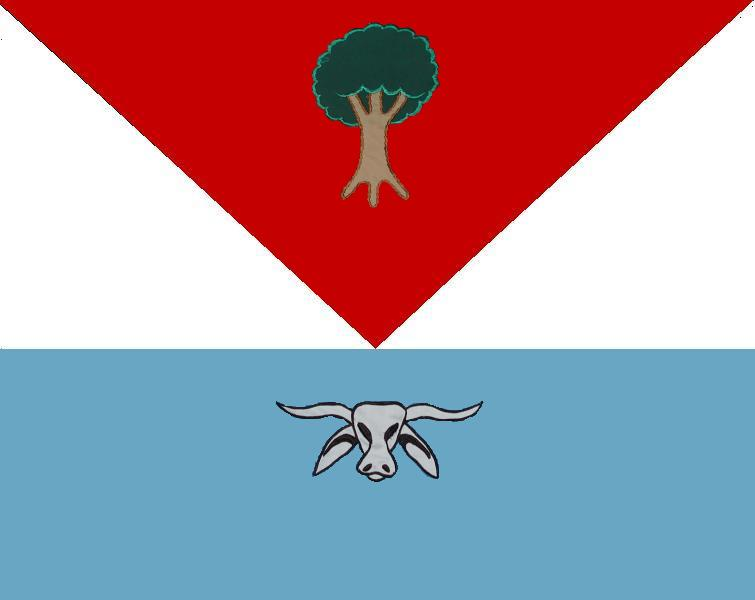
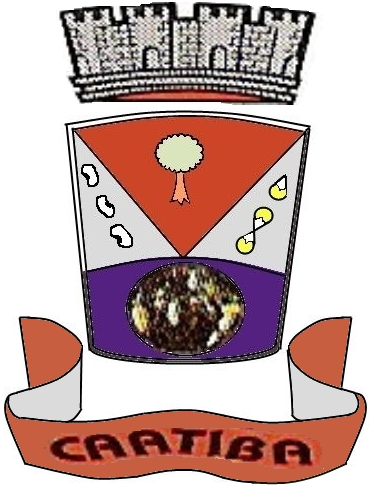
- Flag Coat of arms
- Interactive map of Caatiba
- Country: Brazil
- State: Bahia

Population
  - Total: 6,488
- Time zone: UTC−3 (BRT)

Caatiba is a municipality in the state of Bahia, Brazil. In 2020 it had 6,488 inhabitants. Until 1961 it belonged to the municipality of Vitória da Conquista when it became independent. In 1962 the first election took place and the mayor elected, Iris Geraldo Silveira, started his term in 1963.

== Mayors ==
- 1963–1966 – Iris Geraldo Silveira
- 1967–1970 – Jacson Pereira Rangel
- 1971–1972 – José Nilton Rocha Lobo
- 1973–1976 – Jacson Pereira Rangel
- 1977–1982 – Florival da Costa Barreto
- 1983–1988 – Luíz Miranda de Oliveira
- 1989–1992 – Jailton Matos dos Santos
- 1993–1996 – Luíz Miranda de Oliveira
- 1997–2000 – Humberto de Almeida Antunes
- 2001–2004 – Ernevaldo Mendes de Sousa
- 2005–2007 – Ernevaldo Mendes de Sousa
- 2007–2007 – Omar Sousa Barbosa (October 19, 2007 to October 30, 2007)
- 2007–2008 – Ernevaldo Mendes de Sousa
- 2009–2012 – Omar Sousa Barbosa
- 2013–2016 – Joaquim Mendes de Sousa Júnior (January 1, 2013 to August 22, 2016)
- 2016–2016 – Nailson Batista Silva (August 25, 2016 to December 31, 2016)
- 2017–2017 – Luís Paulo Souza Paiva (January 1, 2017 to June 6, 2017)
- 2017–2020 – Maria Tânia Ribeiro Sousa
- 2021-2024 – Maria Tânia Ribeiro Sousa
