= Geovany Quenda =

Portuguese footballer (born 2007)

Personal information
- Full name: Geovany Tcherno Quenda
- Date of birth: 30 April 2007 (age 19)
- Place of birth: Bissau, Guinea-Bissau
- Height: 1.72 m (5 ft 8 in)
- Positions: Right winger; right wing-back

Team information
- Current team: Chelsea
- Number: 23

Youth career
- 2016–2017: Damaiense
- 2017–2019: Benfica
- 2019–2023: Sporting CP

Senior career*
Years	Team	Apps	(Gls)
2023–2024	Sporting CP B	9	(2)
2024–2026	Sporting CP	54	(4)
2026–	Chelsea	7	(0)

International career^{‡}
2023–2024	Portugal U17	18	(6)
2024–	Portugal U21	16	(7)
2026-	Portugal	1	(0)
Medal record
Men's football
Representing Portugal
UEFA European Under-17 Championship
Runner-up	2024 Cyprus
- * Club domestic league appearances and goals as of 17:39, 21 November 2026 (UTC) ‡ National team caps and goals as of 22:00, 17 November 2026 (UTC)

Geovany Tcherno Quenda (Portuguese pronunciation: [ʒiuˈvɐ̃ˈkẽdɐ]; born 30 April 2007) is a professional footballer who plays as a right-winger or right wing-back for Premier League club Chelsea and the Portugal national team.

Coming through Sporting CP's youth system, Quenda was promoted to the first-team in 2024 and subsequently established himself as an integral player for them, helping them win the domestic double of the Primeira Liga and Taça de Portugal, while also being named the Young Player of the Season.

Born in Guinea-Bissau, he represented Portugal at youth level, being part of the under-17 team that finished as runners-up in the 2024 UEFA European Under-17 Championship.

== Club career ==
=== Early career ===
Geovany Quenda was born in Guinea-Bissau on 30 April 2007. He moved to Portugal as a child and began his footballing career in Amadora, at the Damaiense's under-10s in the 2016–17 season. He attracted the interest of Benfica who took him to the Benfica Campus in Seixal. After two full seasons with Benfica's youth ranks (2017–18 and 2018–19 seasons), Quenda, who was 13 at the time, decided to leave the club for Sporting CP after Benfica failed to provide a room for him at the Benfica Campus as promised.

=== Sporting CP ===
==== 2022–24: Youth career ====
In the 2021–22 season, already fully integrated as a youth player in Sporting CP's Cristiano Ronaldo Academy, he played for Sporting CP's under-15s team, winning the national championship, and the under-17s, scoring 20 goals in that season. In August 2023, he signed a professional contract with Sporting CP.

In the 2023–24 season, Quenda was part of Sporting CP's under-23 team in the Liga Revelação (U-23 league), despite being only 16 years old at the time. He also began to be called up by manager Ruben Amorim for the first team on several occasions, although as an unused substitute. On 17 February 2024, Quenda became the youngest ever player to play for Sporting's reserve team, when he started a Liga 3 game against Amora at the age of 16.

==== 2024–26: Rise to the first team and breakthrough ====
The following season, Quenda was fully integrated to the first team, where he was adapted to play as a right wing-back, despite being naturally a right winger, earning the praise of his manager Ruben Amorim, after impressing during the club's pre-season, stating that "he is very talented, very mature, and understands the game like an adult". He made his first team debut on 3 August, and he became the youngest player (aged 17 years and 95 days) to score for the club, netting the third goal in a 4–3 loss to rivals Porto in the 2024 Supertaça Cândido de Oliveira.

After impressing both offensively and defensively, especially for his young age, according to Ruben Amorim, he earned a place as a starter, with Quenda making his league debut for the club on 9 August in a 3–1 home win over against Rio Ave. On 12 September, he agreed to a contract extension to 2027, increasing his buyout clause from €45 million to €100 million. Five days later, he made his UEFA Champions League debut, starting in the 2–0 victory over Lille during the inaugural matchday of the newly formatted Champions League league phase. On 26 October, he scored his first league goal for the club in a 3–0 win over Famalicão; at 17 years, five months and 27 days, he became the youngest player to score a league goal for Sporting surpassing Sporting CP Youth Academy graduates Simão Sabrosa (17 years, six months and 16 days, in 1997) and Cristiano Ronaldo (17 years, eight months and three days, in 2002).

When new coach Rui Borges joined Sporting, he initially changed the 3–4–3 tactical formation of Ruben Amorim and João Pereira to a conventional 4–4–2. In this tactical change, one of the alterations made was for Quenda to move to the left side of the midfield four, but towards the end of the season Borges reverted to 3–4–3, with Quenda featuring either on the left-wing or as a right-back. On 15 October, he was named by English newspaper The Guardian as one of the best talents born in 2007 worldwide. Having cemented his role up in team, he made 28 appearances as Sporting won its 21st league title, totalling 2,260 minutes, as he was named the Young Player of the Season.

During the season, on 14 March 2025, Sporting CP announced that Quenda would join Premier League club Chelsea in summer 2026.

On 18 September, Quenda closed Sporting's 4–0 win over Kairat, during the inaugural matchday of the Champions League league phase. With that goal, at 18 years, four months and 20 days, he became the youngest Portuguese player ever to score in the UEFA Champions League.

=== Chelsea ===
On 8 July 2026, Quenda officially signed for Chelsea on an eight-year deal, with the transfer fee reported to be £40m.

== International career ==
Quenda chose to represent Portugal internationally. With the under-17 side, Quenda participated in the 2024 UEFA European Under-17 Championship in Cyprus. Portugal finished as runners-up, after losing in the final 3–0 to Italy. For his performances throughout the competition, he was named in the "Team of the Tournament".

He was called up to the senior side for the first time, on 30 August 2024, ahead of the opening UEFA Nations League matches against Croatia and Scotland the following month.

On 11 October, Quenda made his under-21 debut, playing the entire 3–1 win in Faroe Islands in a 2025 UEFA European Under-21 Championship qualifier.

He was called up again to the senior side, on 6 November 2026, for the remaining UEFA Nations League group stage matches against Denmark and Wales during the November international break by Jorge Jesus. He subsequently made his senior international debut as a sub in Portugal's 2-3 win over Wales.

== Style of play ==
Quenda is a left-footed winger who typically operates from the right, exploiting his pace, close control, and dribbling to destabilize defensive lines. He excels in one-on-one situations thanks to his quick acceleration and ability to shift direction fluidly, often driving inside to create scoring chances or deliver cutbacks. Tactically intelligent, he has shown adaptability by performing effectively in wing-back and midfield roles, with a high pressing work rate and off-ball awareness. In 2024, he was praised by then-Portugal national coach Roberto Martinez in an interview with A Bola, who called him "a creative player" and praised his "one-on-one quality".

== Career statistics ==
As of match played 21 November 2026

Appearances and goals by club, season and competition
Club	Season	League			National cup (Note: Includes Taça de Portugal, FA Cup)		League cup (Note: Includes Taça da Liga, EFL Cup)		Europe		Other		Total	
Club	Season	Division	Apps	Goals	Apps	Goals	Apps	Goals	Apps	Goals	Apps	Goals	Apps	Goals
Sporting CP B	2023–24	Liga 3	9	2	—		—		—		—		9	2
Sporting CP	2024–25	Primeira Liga	34	2	6	0	3	0	10 (Note: Appearances in UEFA Champions League)	0	1 (Note: Appearance in Supertaça Cândido de Oliveira)	1	54	3
Sporting CP	2025–26	Primeira Liga	20	2	4	0	1	2	6	2	1	0	32	6
Sporting CP	Total		54	4	10	0	4	2	16	2	2	1	86	9
Chelsea	2026–27	Premier League	7	0	0	0	0	0	—		—		7	0
Career total			70	6	10	0	4	2	16	2	2	1	102	11

=== International ===
As of match played 17 November 2026

Appearances and goals by national team and year
National team	Year	Apps	Goals
Portugal	2026	1	0
Total		1	0

== Honours ==
Sporting CP

- Primeira Liga: 2024–25
- Taça de Portugal: 2024–25

Portugal U17

- UEFA European Under-17 Championship runner-up: 2024

Individual

- UEFA European Under-17 Championship Team of the Tournament: 2024
- UEFA European Under-21 Championship Team of the Tournament: 2025
- Primeira Liga Young Player of the Season: 2024–25
- Primera Liga Young Player of the Month: November 2025
