= Rafael Nel =

Portuguese footballer (born 2002)

Personal information
- Full name: Rafael Ferreira Nel
- Date of birth: 3 April 2005 (age 21)
- Place of birth: Amadora, Portugal
- Height: 1.82 m (6 ft 0 in)
- Position: Forward

Team information
- Current team: Sporting CP
- Number: 90

Youth career
- 2010–2018: Benfica
- 2018–2020: Belenenses
- 2020–2023: Sporting CP

Senior career*
| Years | Team | Apps | (Gls) |
| 2023– | Sporting CP B | 64 | (21) |
| 2024– | Sporting CP | 7 | (2) |

International career^{‡}
| 2023 | Portugal U19 | 7 | (2) |
| 2024 | Portugal U20 | 1 | (0) |
- * Club domestic league appearances and goals as of 20 June 2026 ‡ National team caps and goals as of 20:25, 17 March 2026 (UTC)

Rafael Ferreira Nel (born 3 April 2005) is a Portuguese professional footballer who plays as a forward for Primeira Liga club Sporting CP.

== Club career ==
Nel began playing football with the academy of Benfica before moving to Belenenses, and then finishing his development with Sporting CP in 2020. He signed his first professional contract with Sporting on 22 November 2022. He was promoted to Sporting CP B in the Liga 3 for the 2023–24 season. He made his senior and professional debut with the senior Sporting squad in a 3–1 UEFA Europa League win over Young Boys on 15 February 2024. On 13 August 2024, he again extended his contract with Sporting until 2029.

On 15 February 2026, Nel made his Primeira Liga debut as a substitute in a 1–0 win over Famalicão. A month later, on 17 March, he scored his first goal in the stoppage time of extra time in a 5–0 win over Bodø/Glimt during the Champions League round of 16. He scored his first senior league goal on 03 April 2026 in stoppage time to seal a 4–2 victory over Santa Clara.

== International career ==
Nel is a youth international for Portugal. He was called up to the Portugal U20s for a set of friendlies in March 2024.

Nel scored one of Portugal's goals in a 2–0 victory over Tunisia U20 in the final of the 2026 Maurice Revello Tournament, helping Portugal U20 win the title.
