= 2024–25 Sporting CP season =

Sporting CP
2024–25 season
- President: Frederico Varandas
- Head coach: Ruben Amorim (until 11 November); João Pereira (from 11 November until 25 December); Rui Borges (from 26 December)
- Stadium: Estádio José Alvalade
- Primeira Liga: 1st
- Taça de Portugal: Winners
- Taça da Liga: Runners-up
- Supertaça Cândido de Oliveira: Runners-up
- UEFA Champions League: Knockout phase play-offs
- Top goalscorer: League: Viktor Gyökeres (39); All: Viktor Gyökeres (54)
- Average home league attendance: 42,529
Home colours	Away colours	Third colours

The 2024–25 season was the 132nd season in the history of Sporting CP, and the club's 91st consecutive season in the top flight of Portuguese football. In addition to the domestic league, the club participated in this season's editions of the Taça de Portugal, the Taça da Liga, the Supertaça Cândido de Oliveira, and the UEFA Champions League.

The club completed a domestic double for the first time since the 2001–02 season, after winning the league title and the Taça de Portugal.

== Players ==
=== First-team squad ===
As of 3 February 2025

Note: Flags indicate national team as defined under FIFA eligibility rules; some limited exceptions apply. Players may hold more than one non-FIFA nationality.

No.	Pos.	Nation	Player
1	GK	URU	Franco Israel
2	DF	BRA	Matheus Reis
3	DF	NED	Jerry St. Juste
5	MF	JPN	Hidemasa Morita
6	DF	BEL	Zeno Debast
8	MF	POR	Pedro Gonçalves
9	FW	SWE	Viktor Gyökeres
10	FW	ENG	Marcus Edwards
11	FW	POR	Nuno Santos
17	FW	POR	Francisco Trincão
19	FW	DEN	Conrad Harder
20	FW	URU	Maximiliano Araújo

No.	Pos.	Nation	Player
21	FW	MOZ	Geny Catamo
22	DF	ESP	Iván Fresneda
23	MF	POR	Daniel Bragança (vice-captain)
24	GK	POR	Rui Silva (on loan from Real Betis)
25	DF	POR	Gonçalo Inácio (3rd captain)
26	DF	CIV	Ousmane Diomande
41	GK	BRA	Diego Callai
42	MF	DEN	Morten Hjulmand (captain)
47	DF	POR	Ricardo Esgaio
57	FW	POR	Geovany Quenda
72	DF	POR	Eduardo Quaresma
—	FW	BRA	Gabriel Teixeira

=== Other players under contract ===
Note: Flags indicate national team as defined under FIFA eligibility rules; some limited exceptions apply. Players may hold more than one non-FIFA nationality.

No.	Pos.	Nation	Player
90	FW	POR	Afonso Moreira

== Transfers ==
=== In ===
Pos.	Player	Transferred from	Fee	Date	Source
GK	(Bosnia and Herzegovina) Vladan Kovačević	(Poland) Raków Częstochowa	€5,000,000	1 July 2024	
MF	(Brazil) Kauã Oliveira	(Brazil) Ibrachina FC	Loan with option to buy	1 July 2024	

=== Out ===
Pos.	Player	Transferred to	Fee	Date	Source
GK	(Spain) Antonio Adán		End of contract	1 July 2024	
MF	(Ghana) Abdul Fatawu	(England) Leicester City	€17,000,000	1 July 2024	

== Friendlies ==
=== Pre-season ===
23 July 2024 Friendly	Sporting CP (Portugal)	2–1	(Spain) Sevilla	Faro/Loulé, Portugal
20:30 WEST (UTC+1)	Ribeiro 14'; Trincão 46'; Diomande (red card) 83'	Report	Sow (yellow card) 5'; Ocampos (yellow card) 33'; Martínez (yellow card) 79', (goal) 85'; Collado (yellow card) 83'	Stadium: Estádio Algarve; Referee: Fábio Veríssimo (Portugal)

27 July 2024 Troféu Cinco Violinos	Sporting CP (Portugal)	3–0	(Spain) Athletic Bilbao	Lisbon, Portugal
19:30 WEST (UTC+1)	Gonçalves 10'; Gyökeres (yellow card) 25'; Edwards 80'; Trincão 83'	Report	Jauregizar (yellow card) 16'	Stadium: Estádio José Alvalade; Referee: Tiago Martins (Portugal)

== Competitions ==
=== Overall record ===
Competition	First match	Last match	Starting round	Final position	Record							
Competition	First match	Last match	Starting round	Final position	Pld	W	D	L	GF	GA	GD	Win %
Primeira Liga	9 August 2024	17 May 2025	Matchday 1	Winners	34	25	7	2	88	27	+61	73.53
Taça de Portugal	18 October 2024	25 May 2025	Third round	Winners	7	7	0	0	18	4	+14	100.00
Taça da Liga	29 October 2024	11 January 2025	Quarter-finals	Runners-up	3	2	1	0	5	2	+3	66.67
Supertaça Cândido de Oliveira	3 August 2024		Final	Runners-up	1	0	0	1	3	4	−1	0.00
UEFA Champions League	17 September 2024	19 February 2025	League phase	Knockout phase play-offs	10	3	3	4	13	15	−2	30.00
Total					55	37	11	7	127	52	+75	67.27

Source: Soccerway

=== Primeira Liga ===
==== League table ====
Pos	Team	Pld	W	D	L	GF	GA	GD	Pts	Qualification or relegation
1	Sporting CP (C)	34	25	7	2	88	27	+61	82	Qualification for the Champions League league phase
2	Benfica	34	25	5	4	84	28	+56	80	Qualification for the Champions League third qualifying round
3	Porto	34	22	5	7	65	30	+35	71	Qualification for the Europa League league phase (Note: The 2024–25 Taça de Portugal winners (Sporting) finished in the top two, thus the third place team got the league stage berth.)
4	Braga	34	19	9	6	55	30	+25	66	Qualification for the Europa League second qualifying round
5	Santa Clara	34	17	6	11	36	32	+4	57	Qualification for the Conference League second qualifying round

Source: Liga Portugal
Rules for classification: 1) Points; 2) Head-to-head points; 3) Head-to-head goal difference; 4) Goal difference; 5) Matches won; 6) Goals scored; 7) Play-off.
(C) Champions

==== Results summary ====
Overall								Home						Away					
Pld	W	D	L	GF	GA	GD	Pts	W	D	L	GF	GA	GD	W	D	L	GF	GA	GD
34	25	7	2	88	27	+61	82	14	2	1	40	13	+27	11	5	1	48	14	+34

Source: Liga Portugal

==== Results by round ====
Round	1	2	3	4	5	6	7	8	9	10	11	12	13	14	15	16	17	18	19	20	21	22	23	24	25	26	27	28	29	30	31	32	33	34
Ground	H	A	A	H	A	H	A	H	A	H	A	H	A	H	A	H	A	A	H	H	A	H	A	H	A	H	A	H	A	H	A	H	A	H
Result	W	W	W	W	W	W	W	W	W	W	W	L	L	W	D	W	D	W	W	W	D	D	D	W	W	W	W	D	W	W	W	W	D	W
Position	3	1	1	1	1	1	1	1	1	1	1	1	1	1	2	1	1	1	1	1	1	1	1	1	1	1	1	2	1	1	1	1	1	1
Points	3	6	9	12	15	18	21	24	27	30	33	33	33	36	37	40	41	44	47	50	51	52	53	56	59	62	65	66	69	72	75	78	79	82

Source: Liga Portugal
A = Away; H = Home; W = Win; D = Draw; L = Loss; P = Postponed

==== Matches ====
9 August 2024 1	Sporting CP	3–1	Rio Ave	Lisbon
20:15 WEST (UTC+01:00)	Gonçalves 6', 26'; Gyökeres 63'	Report	Clayton 90'	Stadium: Estádio José Alvalade; Attendance: 38,513; Referee: João Gonçalves

17 August 2024 2	Nacional	1–6	Sporting CP	Funchal
18:00 WEST (UTC+01:00)	Thomas 36'	Report	Gonçalves 16'; Trincão 41', 57'; Gyökeres 51' (pen.), 76'; Bragança 66'	Stadium: Estádio da Madeira; Attendance: 5,058; Referee: Luís Godinho

23 August 2024 3	Farense	0–5	Sporting CP	Faro
20:15 WEST (UTC+01:00)		Report	Gyökeres 27', 41' (pen.), 66'; Áfrico 69' (o.g.); Edwards 81'	Stadium: Estádio de São Luís; Attendance: 17,793; Referee: Tiago Martins

31 August 2024 4	Sporting CP	2–0	Porto	Lisbon
20:30 WEST (UTC+01:00)	Gyökeres 72' (pen.); Catamo 90+3'	Report		Stadium: Estádio José Alvalade; Attendance: 46,413; Referee: Luís Godinho

13 September 2024 5	Arouca	0–3	Sporting CP	Arouca
20:15 WEST (UTC+01:00)		Report	Gonçalves 24'; Gyökeres 73' (pen.); Trincão 80'	Stadium: Estádio Municipal de Arouca; Attendance: 4,644; Referee: João Pinheiro

22 September 2024 6	Sporting CP	3–0	AVS	Lisbon
20:30 WEST (UTC+01:00)	Harder 15'; Gyökeres 45+4', 70'	Report		Stadium: Estádio José Alvalade; Attendance: 43,039; Referee: Ricardo Baixinho

27 September 2024 7	Estoril	0–3	Sporting CP	Estoril
20:15 WEST (UTC+01:00)		Report	Catamo 24'; Morita 31'; Bragança 90+1'	Stadium: Estádio António Coimbra da Mota; Attendance: 4,658; Referee: João Gonçalves

5 October 2024 8	Sporting CP	2–0	Casa Pia	Lisbon
20:30 WEST (UTC+01:00)	Bragança 39'; Gyökeres 80' (pen.)	Report		Stadium: Estádio José Alvalade; Attendance: 42,887; Referee: Miguel Nogueira

26 October 2024 9	Famalicão	0–3	Sporting CP	Vila Nova de Famalicão
20:30 WEST (UTC+01:00)		Report	Gyökeres 57'; Quenda 63'; Inácio 86'	Stadium: Estádio Municipal 22 de Junho; Attendance: 4,520; Referee: Fábio Veríssimo

1 November 2024 10	Sporting CP	5–1	Estrela da Amadora	Lisbon
20:15 WET (UTC±00:00)	Gyökeres 19', 31', 42' (pen.), 70'; Araújo 85'	Report	Pinho 35'	Stadium: Estádio José Alvalade; Attendance: 41,282; Referee: Bruno Vieira

10 November 2024 11	Braga	2–4	Sporting CP	Braga
18:45 WET (UTC±00:00)	R. Horta 20', 45'	Report	Morita 58'; Hjulmand 81'; Harder 89', 90+4'	Stadium: Estádio Municipal de Braga; Attendance: 20,585; Referee: Luís Godinho

30 November 2024 12	Sporting CP	0–1	Santa Clara	Lisbon
20:30 WET (UTC±00:00)		Report	Lopes 33'	Stadium: Estádio José Alvalade; Attendance: 41,681; Referee: Cláudio Pereira

5 December 2024 13	Moreirense	2–1	Sporting CP	Moreira de Cónegos
20:15 WET (UTC±00:00)	Pinto 19'; Schettine 35'	Report	Gyökeres 12' (pen.)	Stadium: Parque Moreira de Cóngeos; Attendance: 5,154; Referee: António Nobre

14 December 2024 14	Sporting CP	3–2	Boavista	Lisbon
20:30 WET (UTC±00:00)	Gyökeres 23'; Trincão 49', 66'	Report	Boženík 43'; Onyemaechi 58'	Stadium: Estádio José Alvalade; Attendance: 34,094; Referee: Fábio Veríssimo

22 December 2024 15	Gil Vicente	0–0	Sporting CP	Barcelos
20:30 WET (UTC±00:00)		Report		Stadium: Estádio Cidade de Barcelos; Attendance: 9,794; Referee: André Narciso

29 December 2024 16	Sporting CP	1–0	Benfica	Lisbon
20:30 WET (UTC±00:00)	Catamo 29'	Report		Stadium: Estádio José Alvalade; Attendance: 48,076; Referee: Fábio Veríssimo

3 January 2025 17	Vitória de Guimarães	4–4	Sporting CP	Guimarães
20:15 WET (UTC±00:00)	Silva 7'; César 69'; Mendes 82'; Michel 85'	Report	Gyökeres 2', 14', 57'; Trincão 90+5'	Stadium: Estádio D. Afonso Henriques; Attendance: 26,549; Referee: João Gonçalves

18 January 2025 18	Rio Ave	0–3	Sporting CP	Vila do Conde
18:00 WET (UTC±00:00)		Report	Aderllan 3' (o.g.); Hjulmand 23' (pen.); Gyökeres 88'	Stadium: Estádio dos Arcos; Attendance: 4,756; Referee: Luís Godinho

25 January 2025 19	Sporting CP	2–0	Nacional	Lisbon
20:30 WET (UTC±00:00)	Trincão 45+1'; Simões 90'	Report		Stadium: Estádio José Alvalade; Attendance: 42,420; Referee: Iancu Vasilica

2 February 2025 20	Sporting CP	3–1	Farense	Lisbon
18:00 WET (UTC±00:00)	Fresneda 11'; Diomande 26'; Harder 88'	Report	Áfrico 45+2'	Stadium: Estádio José Alvalade; Attendance: 43,023; Referee: António Nobre

7 February 2025 21	Porto	1–1	Sporting CP	Porto
20:15 WET (UTC±00:00)	Namaso 90+4'	Report	Fresneda 42'	Stadium: Estádio do Dragão; Attendance: 49,193; Referee: João Pinheiro

15 February 2025 22	Sporting CP	2–2	Arouca	Lisbon
20:30 WET (UTC±00:00)	Harder 17'; Trincão 74'	Report	Silva 8' (o.g.); Araújo 45+5' (pen.)	Stadium: Estádio José Alvalade; Attendance: 39,258; Referee: Miguel Nogueira

23 February 2025 23	AVS	2–2	Sporting CP	Vila das Aves
18:00 WET (UTC±00:00)	Zé Luís 71' (pen.); Mendonça 90+6'	Report	Diomande 8'; Gyökeres 33'	Stadium: Estádio do CD Aves; Attendance: 4,262; Referee: Fábio Veríssimo

3 March 2025 24	Sporting CP	3–1	Estoril	Lisbon
20:15 WET (UTC±00:00)	Inácio 5'; Gyökeres 36', 90+6' (pen.)	Report	Costa 84'	Stadium: Estádio José Alvalade; Attendance: 36,505; Referee: Hélder Carvalho

9 March 2025 25	Casa Pia	1–3	Sporting CP	Rio Maior
18:00 WET (UTC±00:00)	Esgaio 45' (o.g.)	Report	Inácio 12'; Gyökeres 34', 77' (pen.)	Stadium: Estádio Municipal de Rio Maior; Attendance: 6,823; Referee: Hélder Malheiro

15 March 2025 26	Sporting CP	3–1	Famalicão	Lisbon
20:30 WET (UTC±00:00)	Fresneda 1'; Gyökeres 64' (pen.); Catamo 88'	Report	Aranda 35' (pen.)	Stadium: Estádio José Alvalade; Attendance: 41,791; Referee: Miguel Nogueira

29 March 2025 27	Estrela da Amadora	0–3	Sporting CP	Amadora
18:00 WEST (UTC+01:00)		Report	Gyökeres 52' (pen.), 89' (pen.); Quenda 81'	Stadium: Estádio José Gomes; Attendance: 7,031; Referee: Gustavo Correia

7 April 2025 28	Sporting CP	1–1	Braga	Lisbon
20:45 WEST (UTC+01:00)	Gyökeres 15'	Report	Patrão 87'	Stadium: Estádio José Alvalade; Attendance: 45,626; Referee: Luís Godinho

12 April 2025 29	Santa Clara	0–1	Sporting CP	Ponta Delgada
18:00 WEST (UTC+01:00)		Report	Catamo 50'	Stadium: Estádio de São Miguel; Attendance: 8,914; Referee: Cláudio Pereira

18 April 2025 30	Sporting CP	3–1	Moreirense	Lisbon
20:30 WEST (UTC+01:00)	Gyökeres 12', 25', 52'	Report	Teguia 56'	Stadium: Estádio José Alvalade; Attendance: 44,558; Referee: Fábio Veríssimo

27 April 2025 31	Boavista	0–5	Sporting CP	Porto
20:30 WEST (UTC+01:00)		Report	Gyökeres 6', 45+1', 50', 90+2'; Araújo 57'	Stadium: Estádio do Bessa; Attendance: 18,322; Referee: Miguel Nogueira

4 May 2025 32	Sporting CP	2–1	Gil Vicente	Lisbon
20:30 WEST (UTC+01:00)	Araújo 81'; Quaresma 90+3'	Report	Correia 26' (pen.)	Stadium: Estádio José Alvalade; Attendance: 44,666; Referee: Tiago Martins

10 May 2025 33	Benfica	1–1	Sporting CP	Lisbon
18:00 WEST (UTC+01:00)	Aktürkoğlu 63'	Report	Trincão 4'	Stadium: Estádio da Luz; Attendance: 63,478; Referee: João Pinheiro

17 May 2025 34	Sporting CP	2–0	Vitória de Guimarães	Lisbon
18:00 WEST (UTC+01:00)	Gonçalves 55'; Gyökeres 82'	Report		Stadium: Estádio José Alvalade; Attendance: 49,155; Referee: Fábio Veríssimo

=== Taça de Portugal ===
18 October 2024 Third round	Portimonense	1–2	Sporting CP	Portimão
20:15 WEST (UTC+01:00)	Benedict 87'	Report	Harder 40', 90+4'	Stadium: Estádio Municipal de Portimão; Referee: Hélder Malheiro

22 November 2024 Fourth round	Sporting CP	6–0	Amarante	Lisbon
20:45 WET (UTC±00:00)	Edwards 10', 45'; Esgaio 15'; Harder 28'; Trincão 57'; Gyökeres 90'	Report		Stadium: Estádio José Alvalade; Referee: Pedro Ramalho

18 December 2024 Fifth round	Sporting CP	2–1 (a.e.t.)	Santa Clara	Lisbon
20:45 WET (UTC±00:00)	Harder 74'; Gyökeres 113'	Report	Ferreira 90+8'	Stadium: Estádio José Alvalade; Referee: Hélder Malheiro

27 February 2025 Quarter-finals	Gil Vicente	0–1	Sporting CP	Barcelos
20:45 WET (UTC±00:00)		Report	Debast 68'	Stadium: Estádio Cidade de Barcelos; Attendance: 9,101; Referee: Cláudio Pereira

3 April 2025 Semi-finals; First leg	Sporting CP	2–0	Rio Ave	Lisbon
20:15 WEST (UTC+1)	Catamo 12'; Gyökeres 45+1' (pen.)	Report		Stadium: Estádio José Alvalade; Attendance: 30,038; Referee: António Nobre

22 April 2025 Semi-finals; Second leg	Rio Ave	1–2 (1–4 agg.)	Sporting CP	Paços de Ferreira
20:45 WEST (UTC+1)	André Luiz 66'	Report	Inácio 11'; Gyökeres 50'	Stadium: Estádio Capital do Móvel; Attendance: 3,703; Referee: Hélder Carvalho

25 May 2025 Final	Benfica	1–3 (a.e.t.)	Sporting CP	Oeiras
17:15 WEST (UTC+1)	Kökçü 47'	Report	Gyökeres 90+11' (pen.); Harder 99'; Trincão 120+1'	Stadium: Estádio Nacional; Attendance: 37,393; Referee: Luís Godinho

=== Taça da Liga ===
29 October 2024 Quarter-finals	Sporting CP	3–1	Nacional	Lisbon
20:15 WET (UTC±0)	Hjulmand 53'; Gyökeres 65' (pen.), 70'	Report	Macedo 66'	Stadium: Estádio José Alvalade; Attendance: 32,622; Referee: Hélder Carvalho

7 January 2025 Semi-finals	Sporting CP	1–0	Porto	Leiria
19:45 WET (UTC±0)	Gyökeres 56'	Report		Stadium: Estádio Dr. Magalhães Pessoa; Attendance: 20,007; Referee: António Nobre

11 January 2025 Final	Sporting CP	1–1 (6–7 p)	Benfica	Leiria
19:45 WET (UTC±0)	Gyökeres 42' (pen.)	Report	Schjelderup 29'	Stadium: Estádio Dr. Magalhães Pessoa; Attendance: 20,736; Referee: João Pinheiro
	Penalties
	Gyökeres (penalty scored); Hjulmand (penalty scored); Harder (penalty scored); Araújo (penalty scored); Debast (penalty scored); Quenda (penalty scored); Trincão (penalty missed)		(penalty scored) Di María; (penalty scored) Amdouni; (penalty scored) Otamendi; (penalty scored) Aktürkoğlu; (penalty scored) Sanches; (penalty scored) Barreiro; (penalty scored) Florentino

=== Supertaça Cândido de Oliveira ===
3 August 2024 Final	Sporting CP	3–4 (a.e.t.)	Porto	Aveiro
20:15 WEST (UTC+1)	Inácio 6'; Gonçalves 9'; Quenda 24'	Report	Galeno 28', 66'; González 64'; Jaime 101'	Stadium: Estádio Municipal de Aveiro; Attendance: 25,728; Referee: João Pinheiro

=== UEFA Champions League ===
==== League phase ====
The league phase draw was held on 29 August 2024.

Pos	Team	Pld	W	D	L	GF	GA	GD	Pts	Qualification
21	(Scottish Football Association) Celtic	8	3	3	2	13	14	−1	12	Advance to knockout phase play-offs (unseeded)
22	(The Football Association) Manchester City	8	3	2	3	18	14	+4	11	Advance to knockout phase play-offs (unseeded)
23	(Portuguese Football Federation) Sporting CP	8	3	2	3	13	12	+1	11	Advance to knockout phase play-offs (unseeded)
24	(Royal Belgian Football Association) Club Brugge	8	3	2	3	7	11	−4	11	Advance to knockout phase play-offs (unseeded)
25	(Croatian Football Federation) Dinamo Zagreb	8	3	2	3	12	19	−7	11	

Source: UEFA
Rules for classification: League phase tiebreakers

Round	1	2	3	4	5	6	7	8
Ground	H	A	A	H	H	A	A	H
Result	W	D	W	W	L	L	L	D
Position	10	12	8	2	10	17	23	23

Source: UEFA
A = Away; H = Home; W = Win; D = Draw; L = Loss

17 September 2024 1	Sporting CP (Portugal)	2–0	(France) Lille	Lisbon, Portugal
20:00 WEST (UTC+1)	Gyökeres 38'; Debast 65'	Report		Stadium: Estádio José Alvalade; Attendance: 40,024; Referee: Donatas Rumšas (Lithuania)

1 October 2024 2	PSV Eindhoven (Netherlands)	1–1	(Portugal) Sporting CP	Eindhoven, Netherlands
21:00 CEST (UTC+2)	Schouten 15'	Report	Bragança 84'	Stadium: Philips Stadion; Attendance: 34,000; Referee: Marco Guida (Italy)

22 October 2024 3	Sturm Graz (Austria)	0–2	(Portugal) Sporting CP	Graz, Austria
21:00 CEST (UTC+2)		Report	Santos 23'; Gyökeres 53'	Stadium: Liebenauer Stadium; Attendance: 23,691; Referee: Giorgi Kruashvili (Georgia)

5 November 2024 4	Sporting CP (Portugal)	4–1	(England) Manchester City	Lisbon, Portugal
20:00 WET (UTC±0)	Gyökeres 38', 49' (pen.), 80' (pen.); Araújo 46'	Report	Foden 4'	Stadium: Estádio José Alvalade; Attendance: 47,453; Referee: Daniel Siebert (Germany)

26 November 2024 5	Sporting CP (Portugal)	1–5	(England) Arsenal	Lisbon, Portugal
20:00 WET (UTC±0)	Inácio 47'	Report	Martinelli 7'; Havertz 22'; Gabriel 45+1'; Saka 65' (pen.); Trossard 82'	Stadium: Estádio José Alvalade; Attendance: 47,386; Referee: Szymon Marciniak (Poland)

10 December 2024 6	Club Brugge (Belgium)	2–1	(Portugal) Sporting CP	Bruges, Belgium
21:00 CET (UTC+1)	Quaresma 24' (o.g.); Nielsen 84'	Report	Catamo 3'	Stadium: Jan Breydel Stadium; Attendance: 22,254; Referee: Anthony Taylor (England)

22 January 2025 7	RB Leipzig (Germany)	2–1	(Portugal) Sporting CP	Leipzig, Germany
18:45 CET (UTC+1)	Šeško 19'; Poulsen 78'	Report	Gyökeres 75'	Stadium: Red Bull Arena; Attendance: 33,478; Referee: Manfredas Lukjančukas (Lithuania)

29 January 2025 8	Sporting CP (Portugal)	1–1	(Italy) Bologna	Lisbon, Portugal
20:00 WET (UTC±0)	Harder 77'	Report	Pobega 21'	Stadium: Estádio José Alvalade; Attendance: 37,328; Referee: Benoît Bastien (France)

==== Knockout phase ====
===== Knockout phase play-offs =====
The draw for the knockout phase play-offs was held on 31 January 2025.

11 February 2025 First leg	Sporting CP (Portugal)	0–3	(Germany) Borussia Dortmund	Lisbon, Portugal
20:00 WET (UTC±0)		Report	Guirassy 60'; Groß 68'; Adeyemi 82'	Stadium: Estádio José Alvalade; Attendance: 41,543; Referee: Espen Eskås (Norway)

19 February 2025 Second leg	Borussia Dortmund (Germany)	0–0 (3–0 agg.)	(Portugal) Sporting CP	Dortmund, Germany
18:45 CET (UTC+1)		Report		Stadium: Westfalenstadion; Attendance: 80,300; Referee: Davide Massa (Italy)

== Statistics ==
=== Appearances and goals ===
No.	Pos	Nat	Player	Total		Primeira Liga		Taça de Portugal		Taça da Liga		Supertaça Cândido de Oliveira		UEFA Champions League	
No.	Pos	Nat	Player	Apps	Goals	Apps	Goals	Apps	Goals	Apps	Goals	Apps	Goals	Apps	Goals
Goalkeepers
1	GK	(Uruguay) URU	Franco Israel	22	0	11	0	1	0	2	0	0	0	8	0
24	GK	(Portugal) POR	Rui Silva	23	0	17	0	4	0	0	0	0	0	2	0
41	GK	(Brazil) BRA	Diego Callai	0	0	0	0	0	0	0	0	0	0	0	0
Defenders
2	DF	(Brazil) BRA	Matheus Reis	46	0	14+16	0	4+2	0	2	0	0	0	4+4	0
3	DF	(Netherlands) NED	Jerry St. Juste	28	0	5+9	0	4+1	0	2+1	0	0	0	3+3	0
6	DF	(Belgium) BEL	Zeno Debast	48	2	23+8	0	6	1	0+2	0	1	0	7+1	1
20	DF	(Uruguay) URU	Maximiliano Araújo	47	4	19+9	3	4+1	0	3	0	1	0	6+4	1
22	DF	(Spain) ESP	Iván Fresneda	32	3	11+7	3	4+3	0	2+1	0	0+1	0	3	0
25	DF	(Portugal) POR	Gonçalo Inácio	42	6	25+3	3	5	1	1	0	1	1	6+1	1
26	DF	(Ivory Coast) CIV	Ousmane Diomande	46	2	29+2	2	2+1	0	2	0	0+1	0	9	0
43	DF	(Portugal) POR	João Muniz	0	0	0	0	0	0	0	0	0	0	0	0
47	DF	(Portugal) POR	Ricardo Esgaio	18	1	2+7	0	3+1	1	1	0	0	0	2+2	0
54	DF	(Brazil) BRA	Bruno Ramos	1	0	0	0	1	0	0	0	0	0	0	0
55	DF	(Portugal) POR	José Silva	1	0	0+1	0	0	0	0	0	0	0	0	0
72	DF	(Portugal) POR	Eduardo Quaresma	31	1	18+2	1	3	0	1+1	0	1	0	2+3	0
95	DF	(Spain) ESP	Lucas Taibo	1	0	0	0	0+1	0	0	0	0	0	0	0
97	DF	(Portugal) POR	Diogo Travassos	0	0	0	0	0	0	0	0	0	0	0	0
Midfielders
5	MF	(Japan) JPN	Hidemasa Morita	35	2	13+10	2	0+2	0	2	0	1	0	4+3	0
8	MF	(Portugal) POR	Pedro Gonçalves	20	6	12+2	5	2	0	0	0	1	1	2+1	0
23	MF	(Portugal) POR	Daniel Bragança	28	4	14+4	3	2	0	0	0	0+1	0	1+6	1
42	MF	(Denmark) DEN	Morten Hjulmand	46	3	26+2	2	6	0	3	1	1	0	8	0
50	FW	(Portugal) POR	Alexandre Brito	4	0	0+2	0	1	0	0	0	0	0	0+1	0
52	MF	(Portugal) POR	João Simões	18	1	4+5	1	1+1	0	1+1	0	0	0	3+2	0
73	MF	(Portugal) POR	Eduardo Felicíssimo	7	0	2+4	0	0+1	0	0	0	0	0	0	0
81	MF	(Portugal) POR	Henrique Arreiol	4	0	0+3	0	0+1	0	0	0	0	0	0	0
Forwards
9	FW	(Sweden) SWE	Viktor Gyökeres	52	54	31+3	39	4+2	5	2+1	4	1	0	6+2	6
11	FW	(Portugal) POR	Nuno Santos	10	1	4+3	0	1	0	0	0	0	0	2	1
17	FW	(Portugal) POR	Francisco Trincão	54	11	34	9	7	2	2+1	0	1	0	9	0
19	FW	(Denmark) DEN	Conrad Harder	47	10	6+22	4	3+4	5	1+2	0	0	0	4+5	1
21	FW	(Mozambique) MOZ	Geny Catamo	48	7	20+11	5	3+2	1	3	0	1	0	5+3	1
30	FW	(Brazil) BRA	Gabriel Teixeira	7	0	0+3	0	0+2	0	0	0	0	0	1+1	0
57	FW	(Portugal) POR	Geovany Quenda	54	3	26+8	2	3+3	0	1+2	0	1	1	8+2	0
59	FW	(Brazil) BRA	Kauã Oliveira	1	0	0	0	0+1	0	0	0	0	0	0	0
67	FW	(Portugal) POR	Lucas Anjos	1	0	0	0	0	0	0	0	0	0	0+1	0
78	FW	(Portugal) POR	Mauro Couto	2	0	0+1	0	0+1	0	0	0	0	0	0	0
86	FW	(Portugal) POR	Rafael Nel	0	0	0	0	0	0	0	0	0	0	0	0
90	FW	(Portugal) POR	Afonso Moreira	3	0	0+2	0	0	0	0	0	0	0	0+1	0
Players who transferred out during the season
10	FW	(England) ENG	Marcus Edwards	10	3	1+5	1	1	2	1	0	0+1	0	1	0
13	GK	(Bosnia and Herzegovina) BIH	Vladan Kovačević	10	0	6	0	2	0	1	0	1	0	0	0
14	MF	(Portugal) POR	Dário Essugo	2	0	0+2	0	0	0	0	0	0	0	0	0
28	MF	(Portugal) POR	Mateus Fernandes	2	0	0+1	0	0	0	0	0	0+1	0	0	0
80	DF	(France) FRA	Koba Koindredi	0	0	0	0	0	0	0	0	0	0	0	0
91	FW	(Portugal) POR	Rodrigo Ribeiro	2	0	0+1	0	0	0	0	0	0+1	0	0	0

- Source: Soccerway
