= 2024–25 FC Porto season =

FC Porto
2024–25 season
- President: André Villas-Boas
- Head coach: Vítor Bruno (until 20 January 2025); José Tavares (interim, 20 January – 27 January 2025); Martín Anselmi (from 27 January 2025)
- Stadium: Estádio do Dragão
- Primeira Liga: 3rd
- Taça de Portugal: Fourth round
- Taça da Liga: Semi-finals
- Supertaça Cândido de Oliveira: Winners
- UEFA Europa League: Knockout phase play-offs
- FIFA Club World Cup: Group stage
- Top goalscorer: League: Samu Aghehowa (19); All: Samu Aghehowa (27)
- Average home league attendance: 40,609
Home colours	Away colours	Third colours

The 2024–25 season was the 132nd season in the history of FC Porto, and the club's 90th consecutive season in the top flight of Portuguese football. In addition to the domestic league, the club participated in the Taça de Portugal, the Taça da Liga, the Supertaça Cândido de Oliveira, the UEFA Europa League, and the newly expanded FIFA Club World Cup.

This is Porto's first full season since 2017–18 without veteran defender Pepe, who departed the club after his contract expired.

== Players ==
=== Current squad ===
As of 4 February 2025

Note: Flags indicate national team as defined under FIFA eligibility rules; some limited exceptions apply. Players may hold more than one non-FIFA nationality.

No.	Pos.	Nation	Player
3	DF	POR	Tiago Djaló (on loan from Juventus)
4	DF	BRA	Otávio
5	DF	ESP	Iván Marcano
6	MF	CAN	Stephen Eustáquio
7	FW	BRA	William Gomes
8	MF	SRB	Marko Grujić
9	FW	ESP	Samu Aghehowa
10	MF	POR	Fábio Vieira (on loan from Arsenal)
11	FW	BRA	Pepê
12	DF	NGR	Zaidu Sanusi
14	GK	POR	Cláudio Ramos
15	MF	POR	Vasco Sousa
19	FW	CMR	Danny Namaso
20	MF	POR	André Franco
22	MF	ARG	Alan Varela (vice-captain)
23	DF	POR	João Mário

No.	Pos.	Nation	Player
24	DF	ARG	Nehuén Pérez (on loan from Udinese)
25	MF	ARG	Tomás Pérez
27	FW	TUR	Deniz Gül
49	FW	POR	Gonçalo Sousa
51	GK	POR	Diogo Fernandes
52	DF	POR	Martim Fernandes
70	FW	POR	Gonçalo Borges
73	DF	POR	Gabriel Brás
74	DF	POR	Francisco Moura
84	DF	POR	Martim Cunha
86	MF	POR	Rodrigo Mora
91	GK	POR	Gonçalo Ribeiro
94	GK	BRA	Samuel Portugal
97	DF	POR	Zé Pedro
99	GK	POR	Diogo Costa (captain)

=== Technical staff ===
Position	Staff
Head coach	(Argentina) Martín Anselmi
Assistant coaches	(Argentina) Facundo Oreja (Spain) Luis Pastur
Goalkeeper coaches	(Argentina) Dário Herrera (Portugal) Diogo Almeida
Fitness coach	(Uruguay) Diego Bottaioli
Analysts	(Portugal) André Rafael Cardoso (Portugal) Carlos Pintado (Portugal) Filipe Barata (Portugal) José Carlos Monteiro
Club doctor	(Portugal) Nélson Puga
Nurses	(Portugal) José Macedo (Portugal) José Mário Almeida
Recovery specialist	(Portugal) Telmo Sousa
Physiotherapists	(Portugal) Álvaro Magalhães (Portugal) Joca (Portugal) José Ribeiro (Portugal) Nuno Vicente (Portugal) Rúben Silva

Last updated: 27 January 2025
Source: FC Porto

== Transfers ==
=== In ===
Pos.	Player	Transferred from	Fee	Date	Source
DF	(Angola) David Carmo	(Greece) Olympiacos	Loan return	30 June 2024	
MF	(Spain) Fran Navarro	(Greece) Olympiacos	Loan return	30 June 2024	
MF	(Senegal) Mamadou Loum	(Saudi Arabia) Al Raed	Loan return	30 June 2024	
FW	(Portugal) Francisco Conceição	(Netherlands) Ajax	€10,000,000	1 July 2024	
FW	(Spain) Samu Aghehowa	(Spain) Atlético Madrid	€15,000,000	24 August 2024	
FW	(Turkey) Deniz Gül	(Sweden) Hammarby	€4,500,000	24 August 2024	
MF	(Portugal) Fábio Vieira	(England) Arsenal	Loan	27 August 2024	
DF	(Argentina) Nehuén Pérez	(Italy) Udinese	Loan (€4,100,000)	30 August 2024	
DF	(Portugal) Francisco Moura	(Portugal) Famalicão	€5,000,000	2 September 2024	
DF	(Portugal) Tiago Djaló	(Italy) Juventus	Loan	2 September 2024	

=== Out ===
Pos.	Player	Transferred to	Fee	Date	Source
DF	(Mexico) Jorge Sánchez	(Netherlands) Ajax	Loan return	30 June 2024	
FW	(Iran) Mehdi Taremi	(Italy) Inter Milan	End of contract	1 July 2024	
DF	(Portugal) Pepe	Retired	End of contract	1 July 2024	
FW	(Brazil) Evanilson	(England) Bournemouth	€47,000,000	16 August 2024	
DF	(Portugal) Fábio Cardoso	(United Arab Emirates) Al Ain	Loan (€1,000,000)	16 August 2024	
DF	(Angola) David Carmo	(England) Nottingham Forest	€11,000,000	25 August 2024	
FW	(Portugal) Francisco Conceição	(Italy) Juventus	Loan (€7,000,000)	27 August 2024	
FW	(Spain) Toni Martínez	(Spain) Deportivo Alavés	€2,000,000	27 August 2024	
MF	(Portugal) Romário Baró	(Switzerland) Basel	Loan (€150,000)	30 August 2024	
MF	(Senegal) Mamadou Loum	(Portugal) Arouca	Free transfer	1 September 2024	

== Competitions ==
=== Overall record ===
Competition	First match	Last match	Starting round	Final position	Record							
Competition	First match	Last match	Starting round	Final position	Pld	W	D	L	GF	GA	GD	Win %
Primeira Liga	10 August 2024	17 May 2025	Matchday 1	3rd	34	22	5	7	65	30	+35	64.71
Taça de Portugal	20 October 2024	24 November 2024	Third round	Fourth round	2	1	0	1	4	2	+2	50.00
Taça da Liga	31 October 2024	7 January 2025	Quarter-finals	Semi-finals	2	1	0	1	2	1	+1	50.00
Supertaça Cândido de Oliveira	3 August 2024		Final	Winners	1	1	0	0	4	3	+1	100.00
UEFA Europa League	25 September 2024	20 February 2025	League phase	Knockout phase play-offs	10	3	3	4	16	15	+1	30.00
FIFA Club World Cup	15 June 2025	23 June 2025	Group stage	Group stage	3	0	2	1	5	6	−1	0.00
Total					52	28	10	14	96	57	+39	53.85

Source: Soccerway

=== Primeira Liga ===
==== League table ====
Pos	Team	Pld	W	D	L	GF	GA	GD	Pts	Qualification or relegation
1	Sporting CP (C)	34	25	7	2	88	27	+61	82	Qualification for the Champions League league phase
2	Benfica	34	25	5	4	84	28	+56	80	Qualification for the Champions League third qualifying round
3	Porto	34	22	5	7	65	30	+35	71	Qualification for the Europa League league phase (Note: The 2024–25 Taça de Portugal winners (Sporting) finished in the top two, thus the third place team got the league stage berth.)
4	Braga	34	19	9	6	55	30	+25	66	Qualification for the Europa League second qualifying round
5	Santa Clara	34	17	6	11	36	32	+4	57	Qualification for the Conference League second qualifying round

Source: Liga Portugal
Rules for classification: 1) Points; 2) Head-to-head points; 3) Head-to-head goal difference; 4) Goal difference; 5) Matches won; 6) Goals scored; 7) Play-off.
(C) Champions

==== Results summary ====
Overall								Home						Away					
Pld	W	D	L	GF	GA	GD	Pts	W	D	L	GF	GA	GD	W	D	L	GF	GA	GD
34	22	5	7	65	30	+35	71	13	3	1	39	11	+28	9	2	6	26	19	+7

Source: Liga Portugal

==== Results by round ====
Round	1	2	3	4	5	6	7	8	9	10	11	12	13	14	15	16	17	18	19	20	21	22	23	24	25	26	27	28	29	30	31	32	33	34
Ground	H	A	H	A	H	A	H	H	A	H	A	H	A	H	A	H	A	A	H	A	H	A	H	A	A	H	A	H	A	H	A	H	A	H
Result	W	W	W	L	W	W	W	W	W	W	L	W	W	W	W	W	L	L	D	D	D	W	D	W	L	W	W	L	W	W	L	W	W	W
Position	2	3	2	3	2	2	2	2	2	2	2	2	3	2	3	2	2	3	3	3	3	3	3	3	3	3	3	4	4	4	4	3	3	3

Source: Liga Portugal
A = Away; H = Home; W = Win; D = Draw; L = Loss

==== Matches ====
10 August 2024 1	Porto	3–0	Gil Vicente	Porto
20:30 WEST (UTC+01:00)	Galeno 30' (pen.); Jaime 59'; Loader 70' (pen.)	Report		Stadium: Estádio do Dragão; Attendance: 46,813; Referee: Cláudio Pereira

16 August 2024 2	Santa Clara	0–2	Porto	Ponta Delgada
16:00 AZOST (UTC±00:00)		Report	Jaime 16'; Galeno 25' (pen.)	Stadium: Estádio de São Miguel; Attendance: 7,022; Referee: Fábio Veríssimo

24 August 2024 3	Porto	2–0	Rio Ave	Porto
18:00 WEST (UTC+01:00)	Galeno 1'; González 30'	Report		Stadium: Estádio do Dragão; Attendance: 47,113; Referee: Iancu Vasilica

31 August 2024 4	Sporting CP	2–0	Porto	Lisbon
20:30 WEST (UTC+01:00)	Gyökeres 72' (pen.); Catamo 90+3'	Report		Stadium: Estádio José Alvalade; Attendance: 46,413; Referee: Luís Godinho

15 September 2024 5	Porto	2–1	Farense	Porto
15:30 WEST (UTC+01:00)	Galeno 48' (pen.); Aghehowa 75'	Report	Tomané 51'	Stadium: Estádio do Dragão; Attendance: 47,013; Referee: Nuno Almeida

21 September 2024 6	Vitória de Guimarães	0–3	Porto	Guimarães
18:00 WEST (UTC+01:00)		Report	Aghehowa 47', 58'; Pepê 88'	Stadium: Estádio D. Afonso Henriques; Attendance: 26,377; Referee: Fábio Veríssimo

29 September 2024 7	Porto	4–0	Arouca	Porto
18:00 WEST (UTC+01:00)	Aghehowa 47'; González 51'; Galeno 57'; Gül 85'	Report		Stadium: Estádio do Dragão; Attendance: 44,209; Referee: André Narciso

6 October 2024 8	Porto	2–1	Braga	Porto
18:00 WEST (UTC+01:00)	Galeno 45+1' (pen.); Pepê 59'	Report	Fernandes 54'	Stadium: Estádio do Dragão; Attendance: 44,813; Referee: João Pinheiro

28 October 2024 9	AVS	0–5	Porto	Vila das Aves
20:15 WET (UTC±00:00)		Report	González 22'; Aghehowa 32', 38', 45+1'; Mora 88'	Stadium: Estádio do CD Aves; Attendance: 4,795; Referee: Miguel Nogueira

3 November 2024 10	Porto	4–0	Estoril	Porto
20:30 WET (UTC±00:00)	Loader 19'; Pepê 28'; Galeno 77', 87'	Report		Stadium: Estádio do Dragão; Attendance: 39,019; Referee: David Rafael Silva

10 November 2024 11	Benfica	4–1	Porto	Lisbon
20:45 WET (UTC±00:00)	Carreras 30'; Di María 56', 82'; Pérez 61' (o.g.)	Report	Aghehowa 44'	Stadium: Estádio da Luz; Attendance: 63,342; Referee: João Pinheiro

2 December 2024 12	Porto	2–0	Casa Pia	Porto
20:45 WET (UTC±00:00)	Vieira 51'; Aghehowa 55'	Report		Stadium: Estádio do Dragão; Attendance: 32,810; Referee: Hélder Malheiro

7 December 2024 13	Famalicão	1–1	Porto	Vila Nova de Famalicão
20:30 WET (UTC±00:00)	Aranda 44'	Report	Omorodion 52'	Stadium: Estádio Municipal 22 de Junho; Attendance: 4,499; Referee: Luís Godinho

16 December 2024 14	Porto	2–0	Estrela da Amadora	Porto
20:15 WET (UTC±00:00)	González 12'; Borges 90+3'	Report		Stadium: Estádio do Dragão; Attendance: 32,116; Referee: Miguel Nogueira

21 December 2024 15	Moreirense	0–3	Porto	Moreira de Cónegos
20:30 WET (UTC±00:00)		Report	Aghehowa 16'; Mora 66'; Franco 88'	Stadium: Parque Moreira de Cónegos; Attendance: 4,553; Referee: Fábio Veríssimo

28 December 2024 16	Porto	4–0	Boavista	Porto
20:30 WET (UTC±00:00))	Aghehowa 31', 88'; González 55'; Mora 59'	Report		Stadium: Estádio do Dragão; Attendance: 47,509; Referee: João Gonçalves

12 January 2025 17	Nacional	2–0	Porto	Funchal
15:30 WET (UTC±00:00)	Dudu 17'; Zé Vitor 44'	Report		Stadium: Estádio da Madeira; Attendance: 4,466; Referee: Tiago Martins

19 January 2025 18	Gil Vicente	3–1	Porto	Barcelos
20:30 WET (UTC±00:00)	Pablo 11'; Sá 53'; Correia 90+4' (pen.)	Report	Borges 48'	Stadium: Estádio Cidade de Barcelos; Attendance: 7,412; Referee: Fábio Veríssimo

26 January 2025 19	Porto	1–1	Santa Clara	Porto
18:00 WET (UTC±00:00)	Otávio 76'	Report	Gabriel Silva 33'	Stadium: Estádio do Dragão; Attendance: 27,793; Referee: André Narciso

3 February 2025 20	Rio Ave	2–2	Porto	Vila do Conde
20:45 WET (UTC±00:00)	Clayton 37'; Pohlmann 73'	Report	Pérez 51'; Otávio 76'	Stadium: Estádio dos Arcos; Attendance: 4,100; Referee: Gustavo Correia

7 February 2025 21	Porto	1–1	Sporting CP	Porto
20:15 WET (UTC±00:00)	Loader 90+4'	Report	Fresneda 42'	Stadium: Estádio do Dragão; Attendance: 49,193; Referee: João Pinheiro

16 February 2025 22	Farense	0–1	Porto	Faro
18:00 WET (UTC±00:00)		Report	Moura 48'	Stadium: Estádio do Algarve; Attendance: 15,302; Referee: Tiago Martins

24 February 2025 23	Porto	1–1	Vitória de Guimarães	Porto
20:15 WET (UTC±00:00)	Vieira 67'	Report	Embaló 86'	Stadium: Estádio do Dragão; Attendance: 44,142; Referee: António Nobre

1 March 2025 24	Arouca	0–2	Porto	Arouca
18:00 WET (UTC±00:00)		Report	Aghehowa 13' (pen.); Vieira 77'	Stadium: Estádio Municipal de Arouca; Attendance: 3,114; Referee: João Gonçalves

8 March 2025 25	Braga	1–0	Porto	Braga
20:30 WET (UTC±00:00)	Horta 17'	Report		Stadium: Estádio Municipal de Braga; Attendance: 15,922; Referee: Luís Godinho

15 March 2025 26	Porto	2–0	AVS	Porto
18:00 WET (UTC±00:00)	Mora 18'; Vieira 61'	Report		Stadium: Estádio do Dragão; Attendance: 37,286; Referee: Fábio Veríssimo

30 March 2025 27	Estoril	1–2	Porto	Estoril
18:00 WEST (UTC+01:00)	Begraoui 15' (pen.)	Report	Aghehowa 45' (pen.); Mora 64'	Stadium: Estádio António Coimbra da Mota; Attendance: 4,762; Referee: Hélder Malheiro

6 April 2025 28	Porto	1–4	Benfica	Porto
20:30 WEST (UTC+01:00)	Aghehowa 81'	Report	Pavlidis 1', 42', 69'; Otamendi 90+4'	Stadium: Estádio do Dragão; Attendance: 49,193; Referee: João Pinheiro

12 April 2025 29	Casa Pia	0–1	Porto	Rio Maior
20:30 WEST (UTC+01:00)		Report	Mora 5'	Stadium: Estádio Municipal de Rio Maior; Attendance: 3,649; Referee: Hélder Carvalho

18 April 2025 30	Porto	2–1	Famalicão	Porto
18:00 WEST (UTC+01:00)	Mora 20', 57'	Report	Bondo 82'	Stadium: Estádio do Dragão; Attendance: 39,286; Referee: Miguel Nogueira

26 April 2025 31	Estrela da Amadora	2–0	Porto	Amadora
20:30 WEST (UTC+01:00)	Kikas 38'; Ruiz 62' (pen.)	Report		Stadium: Estádio José Gomes; Attendance: 4,273; Referee: David Rafael Silva

2 May 2025 32	Porto	3–1	Moreirense	Porto
20:15 WEST (UTC+01:00)	Aghehowa 70' (pen.), 79'; Moura 40'	Report	Maranhão 31'	Stadium: Estádio do Dragão; Attendance: 27,374; Referee: Gustavo Correia

11 May 2025 33	Boavista	1–2	Porto	Porto
20:30 WEST (UTC+01:00)	Reisinho 34' (pen.)	Report	Mora 20'; Marcano 25'	Stadium: Estádio do Bessa; Attendance: 14,860; Referee: Cláudio Pereira

17 May 2025 34	Porto	3–0	Nacional	Porto
18:00 WEST (UTC+01:00)	Moura 1'; Aghehowa 69' (pen.); Mora 83'	Report		Stadium: Estádio do Dragão; Attendance: 34,674; Referee: José Bessa

=== Taça de Portugal ===
20 October 2024 Third round	Sintrense	0–3	Porto	Amadora
17:00 WEST (UTC+01:00)		Report	Galeno 25'; Jaime 54'; Djaló 59'	Stadium: Estádio José Gomes; Referee: Hélder Carvalho

24 November 2024 Fourth round	Moreirense	2–1	Porto	Moreira de Cónegos
17:00 WET (UTC±00:00)	Nlavo 41'; Alan 77' (pen.)	Report	Pepê 35'	Stadium: Parque Moreira de Cónegos; Referee: Tiago Martins

=== Taça da Liga ===
31 October 2024 Quarter-finals	Porto	2–0	Moreirense	Aveiro
20:45 WET (UTC±0)	Buta 34' (o.g.); Eustáquio 61'	Report		Stadium: Estádio Municipal de Aveiro; Attendance: 3,340; Referee: Gustavo Correia

7 January 2025 Semi-finals	Sporting CP	1–0	Porto	Leiria
19:45 WET (UTC±0)	Gyökeres 56'	Report		Stadium: Estádio Dr. Magalhães Pessoa; Attendance: 20,007; Referee: António Nobre

=== Supertaça Cândido de Oliveira ===
3 August 2024 Final	Sporting CP	3–4 (a.e.t.)	Porto	Aveiro
20:15 WEST (UTC+01:00)	Inácio 6'; Gonçalves 9'; Quenda 24'	Report	Galeno 28', 66'; González 64'; Jaime 101'	Stadium: Estádio Municipal de Aveiro; Attendance: 25,728; Referee: João Pinheiro

=== UEFA Europa League ===
==== League phase ====
===== League table =====
Pos	Team	Pld	W	D	L	GF	GA	GD	Pts	Qualification
16	(Football Association of the Czech Republic) Viktoria Plzeň	8	3	3	2	13	12	+1	12	Advance to knockout phase play-offs (seeded)
17	(Hungarian Football Federation) Ferencváros	8	4	0	4	15	15	0	12	Advance to knockout phase play-offs (unseeded)
18	(Portuguese Football Federation) Porto	8	3	2	3	13	11	+2	11	Advance to knockout phase play-offs (unseeded)
19	(Royal Dutch Football Association) AZ	8	3	2	3	13	13	0	11	Advance to knockout phase play-offs (unseeded)
20	(Danish Football Association) Midtjylland	8	3	2	3	9	9	0	11	Advance to knockout phase play-offs (unseeded)

Source: UEFA
Rules for classification: League phase tiebreakers

===== Results by round =====
Round	1	2	3	4	5	6	7	8
Ground	A	H	H	A	A	H	H	A
Result	L	D	W	L	D	W	L	W
Position	24	24	15	22	23	18	25	18

Source: UEFA
A = Away; H = Home; W = Win; D = Draw; L = Loss

25 September 2024 1	Bodø/Glimt (Norway)	3–2	(Portugal) Porto	Bodø, Norway
18:45 CEST (UTC+2)	Høgh 15'; Hauge 40', 62'	Report	Aghehowa 8'; Gül 90'	Stadium: Aspmyra Stadion; Attendance: 7,587; Referee: Orel Grinfeld (Israel)

3 October 2024 2	Porto (Portugal)	3–3	(England) Manchester United	Porto, Portugal
20:00 WEST (UTC+1)	Pepê 27'; Aghehowa 34', 50'	Report	Rashford 7'; Højlund 20'; Maguire 90+1'	Stadium: Estádio do Dragão; Attendance: 49,211; Referee: Tobias Stieler (Germany)

24 October 2024 3	Porto (Portugal)	2–0	(Germany) TSG Hoffenheim	Porto, Portugal
20:00 WEST (UTC+1)	Djalo 45+2'; Aghehowa 75'	Report		Stadium: Estádio do Dragão; Attendance: 39,203; Referee: Damian Sylwestrzak (Poland)

7 November 2024 4	Lazio (Italy)	2–1	(Portugal) Porto	Rome, Italy
21:00 CET (UTC+1)	Romagnoli 45+2'; Pedro 90+2'	Report	Eustáquio 66'	Stadium: Stadio Olimpico; Attendance: 29,576; Referee: Georgi Kabakov (Bulgaria)

28 November 2024 5	Anderlecht (Belgium)	2–2	(Portugal) Porto	Brussels, Belgium
18:45 CET (UTC+1)	Degreef 52'; Amuzu 86'	Report	Galeno 24' (pen.); Vieira 83'	Stadium: Constant Vanden Stock Stadium; Attendance: 17,717; Referee: Morten Krogh (Denmark)

12 December 2024 6	Porto (Portugal)	2–0	(Denmark) Midtjylland	Porto, Portugal
20:00 WET (UTC±0)	Loader 29'; Aghehowa 56'	Report		Stadium: Estádio do Dragão; Attendance: 36,619; Referee: Aleksandar Stavrev (North Macedonia)

23 January 2025 7	Porto (Portugal)	0–1	(Greece) Olympiacos	Porto, Portugal
17:45 WET (UTC±0)		Report	El Kaabi 79'	Stadium: Estádio do Dragão; Attendance: 35,357; Referee: Clément Turpin (France)

30 January 2025 8	Maccabi Tel Aviv (Israel)	0–1	(Portugal) Porto	Belgrade, Serbia
21:00 CET (UTC+1)		Report	González 58'	Stadium: Partizan Stadium; Attendance: 673; Referee: Nikola Dabanović (Montenegro)

==== Knockout phase ====
===== Knockout phase play-offs =====
13 February 2025 First leg	Porto (Portugal)	1–1	(Italy) Roma	Porto, Portugal
20:00 WET (UTC±0)	Moura 67'	Report	Çelik 45+5'	Stadium: Estádio do Dragão; Attendance: 37,129; Referee: Tobias Stieler (Germany)

20 February 2025 Second leg	Roma (Italy)	3–2 (4–3 agg.)	(Portugal) Porto	Rome, Italy
18:45 CET (UTC+1)	Dybala 35', 39'; Pisilli 83'	Report	Aghehowa 27'; Rensch 90+6' (o.g.)	Stadium: Stadio Olimpico; Attendance: 55,286; Referee: François Letexier (France)

=== FIFA Club World Cup ===
==== Group stage ====
The draw for the group stage was held on 5 December 2024.

Pos	Team	Pld	W	D	L	GF	GA	GD	Pts	Qualification
1	(Brazil) Palmeiras	3	1	2	0	4	2	+2	5 (Note: Tied on head-to-head result (Inter Miami CF 2–2 Palmeiras). Overall goal difference was used as the tiebreaker.)	Advance to knockout stage
2	(United States) Inter Miami CF	3	1	2	0	4	3	+1	5	Advance to knockout stage
3	(Portugal) Porto	3	0	2	1	5	6	−1	2 (Note: Tied on head-to-head result (Porto 4–4 Al Ahly). Overall goal difference was used as the tiebreaker.)	
4	(Egypt) Al Ahly	3	0	2	1	4	6	−2	2	

Source: FIFA
Rules for classification: Group stage tiebreakers
Notes:

15 June 2025 1	Palmeiras (Brazil)	0–0	(Portugal) Porto	East Rutherford, United States
18:00 EDT (UTC−4)		Report		Stadium: MetLife Stadium; Attendance: 46,275; Referee: Saíd Martínez (Honduras)

19 June 2025 2	Inter Miami CF (United States)	2–1	(Portugal) Porto	Atlanta, United States
15:00 EDT (UTC−4)	Segovia 47'; Messi 54'	Report	Aghehowa 8' (pen.)	Stadium: Mercedes-Benz Stadium; Attendance: 31,783; Referee: Cristián Garay (Chile)

23 June 2025 3	Porto (Portugal)	4–4	(Egypt) Al Ahly	East Rutherford, United States
21:00 EDT (UTC−4)	Mora 23'; William Gomes 50'; Aghehowa 53'; Pepê 89'	Report	Abou Ali 15', 45+2' (pen.), 51'; Ali Ben Romdhane 64'	Stadium: MetLife Stadium; Attendance: 39,893; Referee: Jesús Valenzuela (Venezuela)

== Statistics ==
=== Appearances and goals ===
No.	Pos	Nat	Player	Total		Primeira Liga		Taça de Portugal		Taça da Liga		Supertaça Cândido de Oliveira		Europa League		FIFA Club World Cup	
No.	Pos	Nat	Player	Apps	Goals	Apps	Goals	Apps	Goals	Apps	Goals	Apps	Goals	Apps	Goals	Apps	Goals
Goalkeepers
14	GK	(Portugal) POR	Cláudio Ramos	9	0	2	0	2	0	2	0	0	0	0	0	3	0
51	GK	(Portugal) POR	Diogo Fernandes	0	0	0	0	0	0	0	0	0	0	0	0	0	0
91	GK	(Portugal) POR	Gonçalo Ribeiro	0	0	0	0	0	0	0	0	0	0	0	0	0	0
94	GK	(Brazil) BRA	Samuel Portugal	0	0	0	0	0	0	0	0	0	0	0	0	0	0
99	GK	(Portugal) POR	Diogo Costa	43	0	32	0	0	0	0	0	1	0	10	0	0	0
Defenders
3	DF	(Portugal) POR	Tiago Djaló	17	2	6+2	0	2	1	0	0	0	0	6+1	1	0	0
4	DF	(Brazil) BRA	Otávio	28	2	18+2	2	0	0	1	0	1	0	5	0	0+1	0
5	DF	(Spain) ESP	Iván Marcano	14	1	11	1	0	0	0	0	0	0	0	0	3	0
12	DF	(Nigeria) NGR	Zaidu Sanusi	6	0	0+3	0	0	0	0+1	0	0	0	0+2	0	0	0
23	DF	(Portugal) POR	João Mário	42	0	19+8	0	1	0	1+1	0	1	0	7+1	0	3	0
24	DF	(Argentina) ARG	Nehuén Pérez	39	1	24+1	1	2	0	2	0	0	0	9	0	0+1	0
52	DF	(Portugal) POR	Martim Fernandes	37	0	15+10	0	1+1	0	1	0	1	0	3+2	0	2+1	0
73	DF	(Portugal) POR	Gabriel Brás	0	0	0	0	0	0	0	0	0	0	0	0	0	0
74	DF	(Portugal) POR	Francisco Moura	42	4	26+1	3	1+1	0	1	0	0	0	9	1	3	0
84	DF	(Portugal) POR	Martim Cunha	0	0	0	0	0	0	0	0	0	0	0	0	0	0
97	DF	(Portugal) POR	Zé Pedro	30	0	16+4	0	0	0	1	0	1	0	2+3	0	3	0
Midfielders
6	DF	(Canada) CAN	Stephen Eustáquio	45	2	22+8	0	0+1	0	2	1	0+1	0	8	1	1+2	0
7	MF	(Brazil) BRA	William Gomes	11	1	0+8	0	0	0	0	0	0	0	0+1	0	1+1	1
8	MF	(Serbia) SRB	Marko Grujić	5	0	0+2	0	0	0	0	0	1	0	1+1	0	0	0
10	MF	(Portugal) POR	Fábio Vieira	42	5	21+5	4	2	0	0+2	0	0	0	4+5	1	3	0
15	MF	(Portugal) POR	Vasco Sousa	15	0	5+7	0	0	0	0	0	0+1	0	0+2	0	0	0
17	MF	(Spain) ESP	Gabri Veiga	3	0	0	0	0	0	0	0	0	0	0	0	2+1	0
20	MF	(Portugal) POR	André Franco	23	1	4+13	1	0+1	0	2	0	0	0	0+2	0	0+1	0
22	MF	(Argentina) ARG	Alan Varela	47	0	26+5	0	2	0	0+1	0	1	0	9	0	3	0
25	MF	(Argentina) ARG	Tomás Pérez	8	0	1+5	0	0	0	0	0	0	0	0+1	0	0+1	0
86	MF	(Portugal) POR	Rodrigo Mora	35	11	16+7	10	0+2	0	1+1	0	0	0	2+3	0	3	1
Forwards
9	FW	(Spain) ESP	Samu Aghehowa	45	27	23+7	19	0+1	0	1+1	0	0	0	9	6	2+1	2
11	FW	(Brazil) BRA	Pepê	45	6	25+6	3	1	1	1	0	0	0	7+3	1	0+2	1
19	FW	(Cameroon) CMR	Danny Loader	42	4	11+18	3	1+1	0	1	0	1	0	3+5	1	1	0
27	FW	(Turkey) TUR	Deniz Gül	23	2	5+9	1	0	0	1+1	0	0	0	0+6	1	0+1	0
49	FW	(Portugal) POR	Gonçalo Sousa	0	0	0	0	0	0	0	0	0	0	0	0	0	0
70	FW	(Portugal) POR	Gonçalo Borges	38	2	6+20	2	1	0	0+1	0	1	0	2+5	0	0+2	0
Players who made an appearance and/or had a squad number but left the team.
2	DF	(Portugal) POR	Fábio Cardoso	0	0	0	0	0	0	0	0	0	0	0	0	0	0
10	FW	(Portugal) POR	Francisco Conceição	0	0	0	0	0	0	0	0	0	0	0	0	0	0
13	FW	(Brazil) BRA	Galeno	31	12	17+1	8	1+1	1	2	0	1	2	6+2	1	0	0
16	MF	(Spain) ESP	Nico González	29	7	17	5	1+1	0	2	0	1	1	6+1	1	0	0
17	FW	(Spain) ESP	Iván Jaime	15	4	5+4	2	1	1	0+1	0	0+1	1	2+1	0	0	0
18	DF	(Brazil) BRA	Wendell	2	0	0+1	0	1	0	0	0	0	0	0	0	0	0
21	FW	(Spain) ESP	Fran Navarro	7	0	1+3	0	2	0	0	0	0+1	0	0	0	0	0
26	DF	(Angola) ANG	David Carmo	1	0	0	0	0	0	0	0	0+1	0	0	0	0	0
28	MF	(Portugal) POR	Romário Baró	0	0	0	0	0	0	0	0	0	0	0	0	0	0
29	FW	(Spain) ESP	Toni Martínez	1	0	0+1	0	0	0	0	0	0	0	0	0	0	0
30	FW	(Brazil) BRA	Evanilson	0	0	0	0	0	0	0	0	0	0	0	0	0	0
