= Henrique Arreiol =

Portuguese footballer (born 2005)

Personal information
- Full name: Henrique Miguel Sousa Arreiol
- Date of birth: 26 February 2005 (age 21)
- Place of birth: Santa Cruz, Portugal
- Height: 1.87 m (6 ft 2 in)
- Position: Midfielder

Team information
- Current team: Legia Warsaw
- Number: 6

Youth career
- 2013–2018: Marítimo
- 2018–2024: Sporting CP

Senior career*
Years	Team	Apps	(Gls)
2024–2025	Sporting CP B	25	(0)
2024–2025	Sporting CP	3	(0)
2025–	Legia Warsaw	4	(0)
2026–	Legia Warsaw II	1	(0)

International career^{‡}
2021	Portugal U16	1	(0)
2021	Portugal U17	2	(0)
2024–2025	Portugal U20	6	(0)
- * Club domestic league appearances and goals as of 20:47, 14 May 2026 (UTC) ‡ National team caps and goals as of 02:09, 4 March 2025 (UTC)

Henrique Miguel Sousa Arreiol (born 26 February 2005) is a Portuguese professional footballer who plays as a midfielder for Ekstraklasa club Legia Warsaw.

== Career ==
A youth product of Marítimo, Arreiol moved to the youth academy of Sporting CP in 2018. On 27 June 2021, he signed his first professional contract with Sporting. He began his senior career with Sporting CP B for the 2024–25 season in the Liga 3. He made his senior and professional debut with the senior Sporting CP team as a substitute in a 6–0 Taça de Portugal win over Amarante on 22 November 2024. On 24 November 2024, he was formally promoted to Sporting's senior team.

On 15 August 2025, Arreiol signed for Ekstraklasa club Legia Warsaw on a four-year contract.

== International career ==
Arreiol is a youth international for Portugal, having played up to the Portugal U20s in 2024.

== Playing style ==
Arreiol plays as a midfielder and has been compared to João Palhinha in style..

== Career statistics ==
As of match played 3 May 2026

Appearances and goals by club, season and competition
Club	Season	League			National cup (Note: Includes Taça de Portugal)		League cup		Europe		Other		Total	
Club	Season	Division	Apps	Goals	Apps	Goals	Apps	Goals	Apps	Goals	Apps	Goals	Apps	Goals
Sporting CP B	2024–25	Liga 3	25	0	—		—		—		—		25	0
Sporting CP	2024–25	Primeira Liga	3	0	1	0	0	0	0	0	0	0	4	0
Legia Warsaw	2025–26	Ekstraklasa	4	0	0	0	—		0	0	—		4	0
Legia Warsaw II	2025–26	III liga, group I	1	0	0	0	—		—		—		1	0
Career total			33	0	1	0	0	0	0	0	0	0	34	0

== Honours ==
Sporting CP

- Primeira Liga: 2024–25
- Taça de Portugal: 2024–25

Legia Warsaw II

- III liga, group I: 2025–26
