= Bruno Ramos =

Bruno Ramos may refer to:

- Bruno Ramos (politician) (born 1950), Puerto Rican politician
- Bruno Ramos (footballer) (born 2005), Brazilian football centre-back for Sporting CP B

== See also ==
- Bruno Vinícius Souza Ramos (born 1997), known as Bruno Tabata, Brazilian football attacking midfielder for Internacional
