= 2024 Supertaça Cândido de Oliveira =

Supertaça Cândido de Oliveira Vodafone
- Event: Supertaça Cândido de Oliveira (Portuguese Super Cup)
Sporting CP	Porto
3	4
- After extra time
- Date: 3 August 2024
- Venue: Estádio Municipal de Aveiro, Aveiro
- Referee: João Pinheiro
- Attendance: 25,728

The 2024 Supertaça Cândido de Oliveira was the 46th edition of the Supertaça Cândido de Oliveira. It was played between the winners of the 2023–24 Primeira Liga, Sporting CP, and the winners of the 2023–24 Taça de Portugal, Porto, on 3 August 2024. Porto came behind from three goals down to win the match 4–3 after extra time, securing their 24th Supertaça title.

== Venue ==
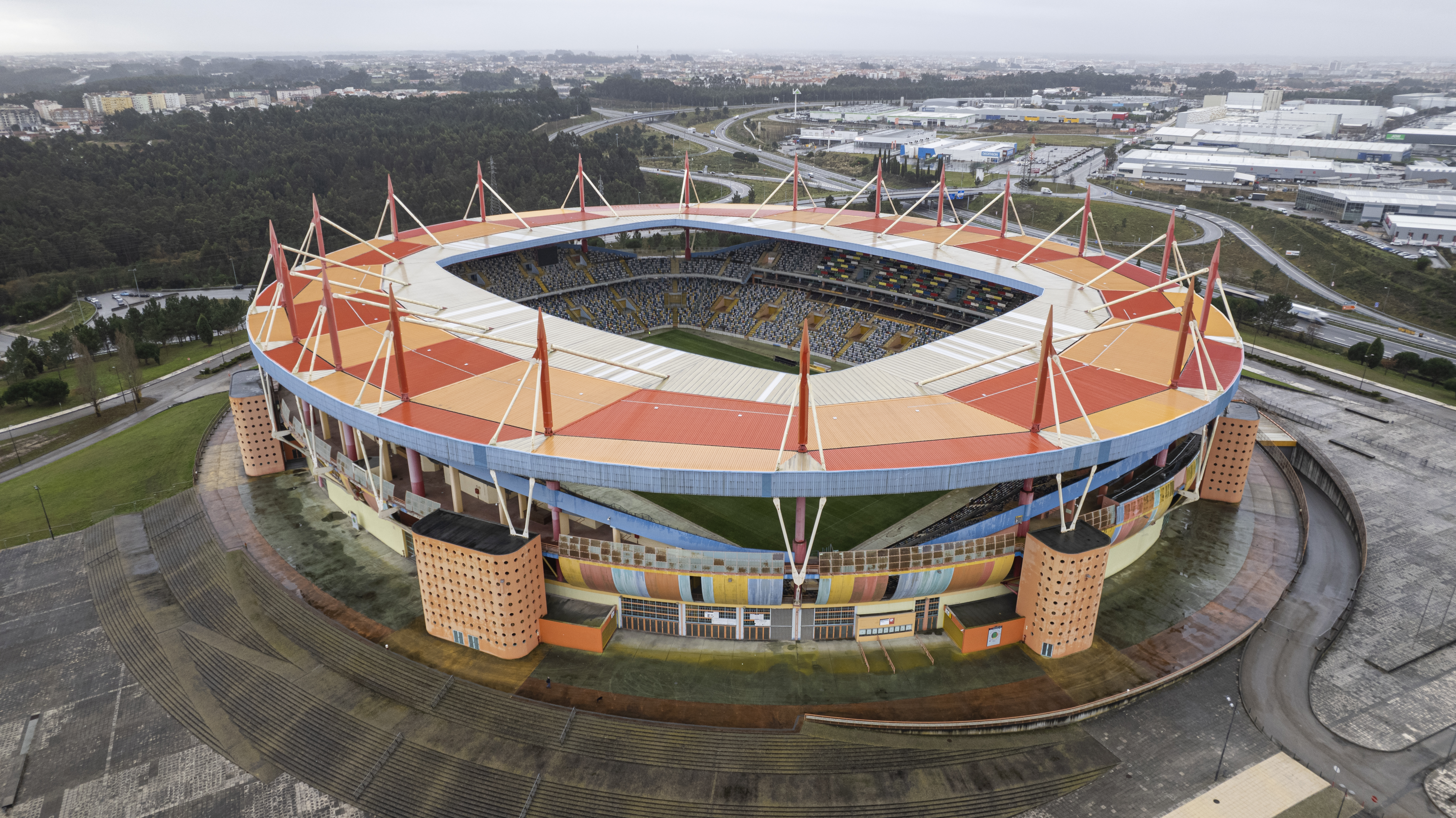
Estádio Municipal de Aveiro

This was the fourteenth time the Supertaça was played at the Estádio Municipal de Aveiro, having hosted all Supertaça matches but two since 2009, both of them played at Estádio Algarve, in 2015 and 2019.

== Match ==
=== Details ===
3 August 2024
20:15 WEST (UTC+01:00)

Sporting CP	3–4 (a.e.t.)	Porto
Inácio 6'; Gonçalves 9'; Quenda 24'	Report	Galeno 28', 66'; González 64'; Jaime 101'

Estádio Municipal de Aveiro, Aveiro
Attendance: 25,728
Referee: João Pinheiro

Sporting CP	Porto

GK	13	(Bosnia and Herzegovina) Vladan Kovačević
CB	72	(Portugal) Eduardo Quaresma	(yellow card) 72'
CB	6	(Belgium) Zeno Debast		(substituted off) 90'
CB	25	(Portugal) Gonçalo Inácio		(substituted off) 101'
RM	57	(Portugal) Geovany Quenda
CM	42	(Denmark) Morten Hjulmand (c)		(substituted off) 103'
CM	5	(Japan) Hidemasa Morita		(substituted off) 89'
LM	20	(Mozambique) Geny Catamo
AM	17	(Portugal) Francisco Trincão		(substituted off) 83'
AM	8	(Portugal) Pedro Gonçalves		(substituted off) 101'
CF	9	(Sweden) Viktor Gyökeres
Substitutes:
GK	1	(Uruguay) Franco Israel
DF	22	(Spain) Iván Fresneda		(substituted on) 101'
DF	26	(Ivory Coast) Ousmane Diomande	(yellow card) 97'	(substituted on) 90'
DF	43	(Portugal) João Muniz
DF	47	(Portugal) Ricardo Esgaio
MF	23	(Portugal) Daniel Bragança		(substituted on) 89'
MF	28	(Portugal) Mateus Fernandes		(substituted on) 101'
FW	10	(England) Marcus Edwards		(substituted on) 83'
FW	91	(Portugal) Rodrigo Ribeiro		(substituted on) 103'
Manager:
(Portugal) Ruben Amorim

GK	99	(Portugal) Diogo Costa
RB	23	(Portugal) João Mário		(substituted off) 63'
CB	97	(Portugal) Zé Pedro
CB	4	(Brazil) Otávio	(yellow card) 97'
LB	52	(Portugal) Martim Fernandes
CM	22	(Argentina) Alan Varela (c)	(yellow card) 67'
CM	8	(Serbia) Marko Grujić		(substituted off) 63'
RW	70	(Portugal) Gonçalo Borges		(substituted off) 83'
AM	16	(Spain) Nico González	(yellow card) 45+2'	(substituted off) 75'
LW	13	(Brazil) Galeno
CF	19	(England) Danny Namaso		(substituted off) 105'
Substitutes:
GK	14	(Portugal) Cláudio Ramos
DF	26	(Angola) David Carmo		(substituted on) 105'
MF	6	(Canada) Stephen Eustáquio		(substituted on) 63'
MF	15	(Portugal) Vasco Sousa		(substituted on) 75'
MF	20	(Portugal) André Franco
FW	17	(Spain) Iván Jaime		(substituted on) 63'
FW	21	(Spain) Fran Navarro		(substituted on) 83'
FW	29	(Spain) Toni Martínez
FW	49	(Portugal) Gonçalo Sousa
Manager:
(Portugal) Vítor Bruno

Match rules
- 90 minutes.
- 30 minutes of extra time if necessary.
- Penalty shoot-out if scores still level.
- Nine named substitutes, of which up to five may be used during regular time.

== See also ==
- FC Porto–Sporting CP rivalry
- 2024–25 Primeira Liga
- 2024–25 Taça de Portugal
- 2024–25 Taça da Liga
- 2024–25 FC Porto season
- 2024–25 Sporting CP season
