= Vasco Sousa (footballer) =

Portuguese footballer

Personal information
- Full name: Vasco José Cardoso Sousa
- Date of birth: 3 April 2003 (age 23)
- Place of birth: Paredes, Portugal
- Height: 1.62 m (5 ft 4 in)
- Position: Midfielder

Team information
- Current team: Porto
- Number: 15

Youth career
- 2010–2011: FC Cristelo
- 2011–2014: Paços de Ferreira
- 2014–2019: Vitória SC
- 2019–2021: Porto

Senior career*
Years	Team	Apps	(Gls)
2021–2024	Porto B	87	(5)
2023–	Porto	13	(0)
2025–2026	→ Moreirense (loan)	9	(1)

International career^{‡}
2018	Portugal U15	3	(1)
2018–2019	Portugal U16	11	(1)
2019–2020	Portugal U17	5	(0)
2021–2022	Portugal U19	3	(0)
2022–2024	Portugal U21	13	(0)
- * Club domestic league appearances and goals as of 23:54, 14 December 2025 (UTC) ‡ National team caps and goals as of 15:17, 9 November 2025 (UTC)

Vasco José Cardoso Sousa (born 3 April 2003) is a Portuguese professional footballer who plays as a midfielder for Primeira Liga club Porto.

== Club career ==
At youth level, Sousa represented FC Cristelo, Paços de Ferreira and Vitória SC. In July 2019, aged 16 years old, he joined FC Porto's youth ranks. Quickly rising through the Porto youth ranks, at the end of the 2020–21 season, Sousa was promoted to the Porto B team, competing in Liga Portugal 2. At the start of the following campaign, he signed a new contract with the Dragons, until 2025.

Sousa made his senior debut for Porto B on 7 August 2021, in a league clash at home to Trofense; coming off the bench to replace Bernardo Folha on the 83rd minute, Vasco scored a last-minute equalizer to salvage a 2–2 draw.

On 5 February 2023, Sousa made his debut for Porto's main team, coming on as a substitute for the final minutes of a 2–0 home victory over Vizela in the Primeira Liga.

On 16 February 2025, in a league match away at Farense, following a tackle from Zé Carlos, Sousa suffered a broken fibula, which required surgery and kept him sidelined for over three months.

On 1 September 2025, after renewing his contract with Porto until 2030, Sousa was sent on a season-long loan to fellow Primeira Liga side Moreirense, which included an €8 million optional buy-clause. On 14 December 2025, in a home match against Benfica, he broke his right fibula for a second time.

== International career ==
Sousa has represented Portugal at youth international level.

== Career statistics ==
=== Club ===
As of match played 14 December 2025

Appearances and goals by club, season and competition
Club	Season	League			National cup		League cup		Continental		Other		Total	
Club	Season	Division	Apps	Goals	Apps	Goals	Apps	Goals	Apps	Goals	Apps	Goals	Apps	Goals
Porto B	2021–22	Liga Portugal 2	27	1	—		—		—		—		27	1
Porto B	2022–23	Liga Portugal 2	30	1	—		—		—		—		30	1
Porto B	2023–24	Liga Portugal 2	30	1	—		—		—		—		30	1
Porto B	Total		87	3	—		—		—		—		87	3
Porto	2022–23	Primeira Liga	1	0	0	0	0	0	0	0	0	0	1	0
Porto	2024–25	Primeira Liga	12	0	0	0	0	0	2 (Note: Appearances in UEFA Europa League)	0	1 (Note: Appearance in Supertaça Cândido de Oliveira)	0	15	0
Porto	Total		13	0	0	0	0	0	2	0	1	0	16	0
Moreirense (loan)	2025–26	Primeira Liga	9	1	0	0	0	0	0	0	—		9	1
Career total			109	4	0	0	0	0	2	0	1	0	112	4

== Honours ==
Porto

- Supertaça Cândido de Oliveira: 2024
