= Iván Jaime =

Spanish footballer (born 2000)

Personal information
- Full name: Iván Jaime Pajuelo
- Date of birth: 26 September 2000 (age 26)
- Place of birth: Málaga, Spain
- Height: 1.80 m (5 ft 11 in)
- Positions: Attacking midfielder; winger

Team information
- Current team: Las Palmas (on loan from Porto)
- Number: 24

Youth career
- 2005–2009: Roma Luz
- 2009–2011: Conejito
- 2011–2017: Málaga

Senior career*
Years	Team	Apps	(Gls)
2017–2020	Málaga B	54	(7)
2018–2020	Málaga	3	(0)
2020–2023	Famalicão	64	(14)
2023–	Porto	30	(3)
2025	→ Valencia (loan)	9	(0)
2025–2026	→ CF Montréal (loan)	18	(1)
2026–	→ Las Palmas (loan)	0	(0)

International career^{‡}
2018–2019	Spain U19	4	(1)
- * Club domestic league appearances and goals as of 11 August 2026 ‡ National team caps and goals as of 31 August 2023

Iván Jaime Pajuelo (born 26 September 2000) is a Spanish footballer who plays as an attacking midfielder or winger for UD Las Palmas, on loan from Primeira Liga club FC Porto.

== Club career ==
=== Málaga ===
Born in Málaga, Andalusia, Jaime joined Málaga CF's youth setup in 2011. He made his senior debut with the reserves on 26 November 2017, coming on as a first-half substitute in a 1–0 Tercera División away win against Villacarrillo CF.

On 11 September 2018, fifteen days shy of his 18th birthday, Jaime made his first-team debut by replacing fellow debutant Abdel Abqar in a 1–2 home loss against UD Almería for the season's Copa del Rey. He scored his first senior goal on 25 November, netting the opener for the B's through a penalty kick in a 2–1 home defeat of Atlético Sanluqueño CF in the Segunda División B championship.

On 28 February 2019, Jaime renewed his contract with the Blanquiazules until 2022. He made his Segunda División debut on 12 June of the following year, replacing fellow youth graduate Luis Muñoz late into a 1–3 home loss against SD Huesca.

=== Famalicão ===
On 23 September 2020, Jaime moved abroad and signed a five-year contract with Portuguese Primeira Liga side F.C. Famalicão. He scored his first professional goal the following 4 April, netting his team's second in a 2–0 home win over F.C. Paços de Ferreira; late in the month, he scored a brace in a 3–0 success at Gil Vicente F.C.

In the 2022–23 season, Jaime scored 11 goals and made 5 assists in 33 appearances in all competitions for Famalicão. That season, He also received the awards of Midfielder of the Month for April 2023 and Young Player of the Season.

=== Porto ===
On 31 August 2023, Portuguese giants FC Porto announced the signing of Jaime on a five-year contract, for a reported fee of €10 million for 90% of the player's economic rights. He made his debut three days later, coming off the bench to replace Nico González in the 85th minute of a 1–1 league draw at home against Arouca. On 15 September, Jaime made his first start for Porto, in a 1–0 league win away at Estrela da Amadora. Four days later, he made his UEFA Champions League debut, starting in a 3–1 away victory over Shakhtar Donetsk. On 23 September, Jaime scored his first goal for Porto, the opener in a 2–1 league victory over Gil Vicente in the Estádio do Dragão.

==== Loan to Valencia ====
On 3 February 2025, Jaime returned to Spain and joined Valencia CF on loan with an option to buy.

==== Loan to Montréal ====
On 22 August 2025, CF Montréal announced the acquisition of Jaime as a Designated Player through a loan with an option to buy. The loan ran until 30 June 2026.

==== Loan to Las Palmas ====
On 20 August 2026, Jaime returned to the Spanish second division after agreeing to a one-year loan deal with UD Las Palmas.

== Career statistics ==
As of match played 18 October 2025

Appearances and goals by club, season and competition
Club	Season	League			National cup (Note: Includes Copa del Rey, Taça de Portugal)		League cup (Note: Includes Taça da Liga)		Continental		Other		Total	
Club	Season	Division	Apps	Goals	Apps	Goals	Apps	Goals	Apps	Goals	Apps	Goals	Apps	Goals
Málaga B	2018–19	Segunda División B	30	3	—		—		—		—		30	3
Málaga B	2019–20	Tercera División	24	4	—		—		—		—		24	4
Málaga B	Total		54	7	—		—		—		—		54	7
Málaga	2018–19	Segunda División	0	0	1	0	—		—		—		1	0
Málaga	2019–20	Segunda División	3	0	0	0	—		—		—		3	0
Málaga	Total		3	0	1	0	—		—		—		4	0
Famalicão	2020–21	Primeira Liga	22	4	2	0	0	0	—		—		24	4
Famalicão	2021–22	Primeira Liga	18	1	3	1	4	0	—		—		25	2
Famalicão	2022–23	Primeira Liga	24	9	5	2	4	0	—		—		33	11
Famalicão	Total		64	14	10	3	8	0	—		—		82	17
Porto	2023–24	Primeira Liga	21	1	3	0	1	0	4 (Note: Appearances in UEFA Champions League)	0	0	0	29	1
Porto	2024–25	Primeira Liga	9	2	1	1	1	0	3 (Note: Appearances in UEFA Europa League)	0	1 (Note: Appearance in Supertaça Cândido de Oliveira)	1	15	4
Porto	Total		30	3	4	1	2	0	7	0	1	1	44	5
Valencia (loan)	2024–25	La Liga	9	0	1	0	—		—		—		10	0
CF Montréal (loan)	2025	MLS	6	0	0	0	—		—		0	0	6	0
Career total			166	24	16	4	10	0	7	0	1	1	200	29

== Honours ==
Porto

- Taça de Portugal: 2023–24
- Supertaça Cândido de Oliveira: 2024

Individual

- Primeira Liga Young Player of the Season: 2022–23
