= Zé Pedro (footballer, born June 1997) =

Portuguese footballer

Personal information
- Full name: José Pedro da Silva Figueiredo Freitas
- Date of birth: 6 June 1997 (age 29)
- Place of birth: Guimarães, Portugal
- Height: 1.87 m (6 ft 2 in)
- Position: Centre-back

Team information
- Current team: Cagliari
- Number: 2

Youth career
- 2006–2010: Vitória Guimarães
- 2010–2013: Sandinenses
- 2013–2015: Vizela

Senior career*
Years	Team	Apps	(Gls)
2015–2017	Vizela	3	(0)
2016–2017	→ Torcatense (loan)	23	(1)
2017–2018	Fafe	29	(1)
2018–2020	Braga B	0	(0)
2020–2021	Estrela Amadora	28	(3)
2021–2024	Porto B	75	(5)
2021–2025	Porto	34	(2)
2025–	Cagliari	23	(0)
- * Club domestic league appearances and goals as of 01:43, 27 May 2026 (UTC)

José Pedro da Silva Figueiredo Freitas (born 6 June 1997), known as Zé Pedro, is a Portuguese professional footballer who plays as a centre-back for Serie A club Cagliari.

== Club career ==
=== Early career ===
Zé Pedro was born in Guimarães. He started playing football with local Vitória de Guimarães at the age of nine, and finished his youth career at Vizela.

Zé Pedro spent his first six seasons as a senior in the Portuguese third division, with Vizela, Torcatense, Fafe, Braga B and Estrela da Amadora. He helped the latter club to promote to the Liga Portugal 2 in 2020–21 by contributing 28 games and five goals, adding a further five appearances at it reached the round of 16 in the Taça de Portugal.

=== Porto ===
On 21 July 2021, Zé Pedro signed a three-year contract with Porto for €250.000 and 80% of his sporting rights, being assigned to the reserve side in the second division. He made his debut as a professional on 7 August in a 2–2 home draw against Trofense, scoring his first league goal the following month to help the hosts defeat Mafra 3–1.

Zé Pedro made his competitive debut for the first team on 15 December 2021, playing the entire 1–0 win over Rio Ave in the group stage of the Taça da Liga as they were already eliminated. On 7 August 2023, he extended his link until 2026, and his Primeira Liga bow took place on 29 September in a 1–0 loss at Benfica; habitual starters Iván Marcano and Pepe were injured, and he came on as a 25th-minute substitute for Romário Baró after Fábio Cardoso was sent off. He scored his first goal in the top tier on 9 December, in a 3–1 home victory against Casa Pia.

=== Cagliari ===
On 31 August 2025, Zé Pedro joined Serie A club Cagliari on a three-year deal, for €3.5 million.

== Career statistics ==
As of match played 24 May 2026

Appearances and goals by club, season and competition
Club	Season	League			National cup		League cup		Continental		Other		Total	
Club	Season	Division	Apps	Goals	Apps	Goals	Apps	Goals	Apps	Goals	Apps	Goals	Apps	Goals
Vizela	2015–16	Campeonato de Portugal	3	0	0	0	—		—		—		3	0
Torcatense (loan)	2016–17	Campeonato de Portugal	23	1	0	0	—		—		—		23	1
Fafe	2017–18	Campeonato de Portugal	29	1	1	0	—		—		—		30	1
Braga B	2018–19	LigaPro	0	0	—		—		—		—		0	0
Braga B	2019–20	Campeonato de Portugal	0	0	—		—		—		—		0	0
Braga B	Total		0	0	—		—		—		—		0	0
Estrela Amadora	2020–21	Campeonato de Portugal	28	3	5	0	—		—		—		33	3
Porto B	2021–22	Liga Portugal 2	28	3	—		—		—		—		28	3
Porto B	2022–23	Liga Portugal 2	33	1	—		—		—		—		33	1
Porto B	2023–24	Liga Portugal 2	14	1	—		—		—		—		14	1
Porto B	Total		75	5	—		—		—		—		75	5
Porto	2021–22	Primeira Liga	0	0	0	0	1	0	0	0	—		1	0
Porto	2023–24	Primeira Liga	12	2	3	0	2	0	0	0	—		17	2
Porto	2024–25	Primeira Liga	20	0	0	0	1	0	5 (Note: Appearances in UEFA Europa League)	0	4 (Note: One appearance in Supertaça Cândido de Oliveira, three appearances in FIFA Club World Cup)	0	30	0
Porto	2025–26	Primeira Liga	2	0	0	0	0	0	0	0	0	0	2	0
Porto	Total		34	2	3	0	4	0	5	0	4	0	50	2
Cagliari	2025–26	Serie A	23	0	1	0	—		—		—		24	0
Career total			215	12	10	0	4	0	5	0	4	0	238	12

== Honours ==
Porto

- Primeira Liga: 2025–26
- Taça de Portugal: 2023–24
- Supertaça Cândido de Oliveira: 2024

Individual

- Liga Portugal 2 Defender of the Month: October/November 2023
