= José Silva (footballer, born 2005) =

Portuguese footballer

Personal information
- Full name: José Augusto Silva
- Date of birth: 20 August 2005 (age 21)
- Place of birth: Cascais, Portugal
- Height: 1.80 m (5 ft 11 in)
- Position: Right-back

Team information
- Current team: Gil Vicente
- Number: 2

Youth career
- 2013–2015: GDR Fontainhas
- 2015–2019: Estoril
- 2019–2024: Sporting CP

Senior career*
Years	Team	Apps	(Gls)
2024–2026	Sporting CP B	39	(2)
2025–2026	Sporting CP	1	(0)
2026	→ Arouca (loan)	4	(0)
2026–	Gil Vicente	2	(0)

International career^{‡}
2025–	Portugal U20	8	(0)
- * Club domestic league appearances and goals as of 6 September 2026 ‡ National team caps and goals as of 13 June 2026

José Augusto Silva (born 20 August 2005) is a Portuguese professional footballer who plays as a right-back for Primeira Liga club Gil Vicente.

== Club career ==
Silva is a youth product of GDR Fontainhas, Estoril and Sporting CP. On 29 September 2021, he signed his first professional contract with Sporting at the age of 16. He debuted with Sporting's reserves in the Liga 3 in 2024. On 1 May 2024, he extended his contract with Sporting. He made his senior and professional debut with Sporting in a 3–1 Primeira Liga win over Estoril on 3 March 2025. On 17 May 2025, he helped Sporting CP B earn promotion to the Liga Portugal 2.

In March 2025, he was called up to the Portugal U20s.

On 7 July 2026, Silva signed a three-season contract with Gil Vicente.

== Honours ==
Sporting CP

- Primeira Liga: 2024–25
