= Kauã Oliveira =

Brazilian footballer

Personal information
- Full name: Kauã Wellhington Oliveira Pinto
- Date of birth: 22 December 2003 (age 22)
- Place of birth: Feira Nova do Maranhão, Brazil
- Height: 1.86 m (6 ft 1 in)
- Position: Midfielder

Team information
- Current team: Sporting CP B
- Number: 59

Youth career
- 2021–2022: Portuguesa
- 2022–2024: Ibrachina FC

Senior career*
Years	Team	Apps	(Gls)
2024–2025	Ibrachina FC	0	(0)
2024–2025	→ Sporting CP B (loan)	20	(1)
2025	→ Sporting CP (loan)	0	(0)
2025–	Sporting CP B	14	(0)
- * Club domestic league appearances and goals as of 20 June 2026

Kauã Wellhington Oliveira Pinto (born 22 December 2003) is a Brazilian professional footballer who plays as a midfielder for Liga Portugal 2 club Sporting CP B.

== Club career ==
On 31 January 2024, he joined Sporting CP on loan from Ibrachina with an option to buy. He debuted with Sporting CP B in the Liga 3, and on 13 September 2024 had his loan extended until the end of the 2024–25 season. He made his senior and professional debut with the senior Sporting CP team as a substitute in a 1–0 win Taça de Portugal win over Gil Vicente on 27 February 2025. On 30 April 2025, he fractured his leg, ending his season. On 17 May 2025, Sporting CP B earned promotion to the Liga Portugal 2 with his contributions.

== Honours ==
Sporting CP

- Taça de Portugal: 2024–25
