= Lucas Taibo =

Spanish footballer

Personal information
- Full name: Lucas Taibo Domínguez
- Date of birth: 2 March 2006 (age 20)
- Place of birth: A Coruña, Spain
- Height: 1.94 m (6 ft 4 in)
- Position: Centre-back

Team information
- Current team: Sporting CP B
- Number: 95

Youth career
- 2015–2020: Deportivo de La Coruña
- 2020–2021: San Tirso
- 2021–2022: Deportivo de La Coruña
- 2022–2023: Sporting CP

Senior career*
Years	Team	Apps	(Gls)
2023–	Sporting CP B	35	(0)
2024–	Sporting CP	0	(0)

International career^{‡}
2024	Galicia	1	(0)
- * Club domestic league appearances and goals as of 20 June 2026 ‡ National team caps and goals as of 01:34, 26 May 2025 (UTC)

Lucas Taibo Domínguez (born 2 March 2006) is a Spanish professional footballer who plays as a centre-back for Sporting CP B.

== Club career ==
A youth product of the Spanish clubs San Tirso and Deportivo de La Coruña, Taibo joined the academy of Sporting CP on 11 August 2022. He was promoted to their reserves in 2023. On 15 August 2024, he extended his contract with Sporting until 2029. He made his senior and professional debut with the senior Sporting CP team as a substitute in a 2–1 win Taça de Portugal win over Portimonense on 18 October 2024. On 17 May 2025, he helped Sporting CP B earn promotion to the Liga Portugal 2.

== International career ==
Taibo played for Galicia national team in a friendly 2–0 loss to Panama on 31 May 2024. In August 2024, he was called up to the Spain U19s for a training camp.

== Personal life ==
Taibo's father, Roberto Taibo, played football for Deportivo de La Coruña in the late 70s.

== Honours ==
Sporting CP

- Taça de Portugal: 2024–25
