= Gonçalo Ribeiro (footballer) =

Portuguese footballer

Personal information
- Full name: Gonçalo Miguel Azevedo Ribeiro
- Date of birth: 15 January 2006 (age 20)
- Place of birth: Vila Nova de Gaia, Portugal
- Height: 1.87 m (6 ft 2 in)
- Position: Goalkeeper

Team information
- Current team: Porto B
- Number: 91

Youth career
- 2012–2013: FC Pedroso
- 2013–2022: Porto

Senior career*
Years	Team	Apps	(Gls)
2022–	Porto B	45	(0)

International career^{‡}
2021–2022	Portugal U16	5	(0)
2022–2023	Portugal U17	12	(0)
2022	Portugal U18	4	(0)
2022–	Portugal U19	17	(0)
2023–	Portugal U20	4	(0)
Medal record
Men's football
Representing Portugal
UEFA European Under-19 Championship
Runner-up	2023 Malta
- * Club domestic league appearances and goals as of 19 June 2026 ‡ National team caps and goals as of 15:27, 8 November 2025 (UTC)

Gonçalo Miguel Azevedo Ribeiro (born 15 January 2006) is a Portuguese professional footballer who plays as a goalkeeper for Liga Portugal 2 club Porto B.

== Club career ==
Ribeiro is a youth product of FC Pedroso, Dragon Force FC, and Porto. He signed his first professional contract with Porto on 8 April 2022 until 2026. He made his professional debut with Porto B in a 3–2 Liga Portugal 2 win over B-SAD on 14 August 2022, and 16 years 6 months and 31 days years old became the youngest ever goalkeeper in the division's history. He was named Porto's 2022 Young Athlete of the Year in December 2022. On 11 October 2023, he was named by English newspaper The Guardian as one of the best players born in 2006 worldwide.

On 26 January 2024, Ribeiro extended his contract with Porto until 2028.

== International career ==
Ribeiro is a youth international for Portugal, having played up to the Portugal U20s.

== Career statistics ==
As of match played 30 March 2025

Appearances and goals by club, season and competition
Club	Season	League			National cup		League cup		Total	
Club	Season	Division	Apps	Goals	Apps	Goals	Apps	Goals	Apps	Goals
Porto B	2022–23	Liga Portugal 2	7	0	—		—		7	0
Porto B	2023–24	Liga Portugal 2	8	0	—		—		8	0
Porto B	2024–25	Liga Portugal 2	14	0					14	0
Porto B	Total		29	0	—		—		29	0
Career total			29	0	0	0	0	0	29	0

== Honours ==
Porto

- Taça de Portugal: 2023–24

Individual

- UEFA European Under-19 Championship Team of the Tournament: 2023
