= Lucas Anjos =

Portuguese footballer (born 2005)

Personal information
- Full name: Lucas Rodrigues Carvalho Anjos
- Date of birth: 7 July 2004 (age 22)
- Place of birth: Santarém, Portugal
- Height: 1.86 m (6 ft 1 in)
- Position: Forward

Team information
- Current team: Sporting CP B
- Number: 67

Youth career
- 2011–2012: União Almeirim
- 2012–2015: Académica de Santarém
- 2015–2025: Sporting CP

Senior career*
Years	Team	Apps	(Gls)
2023–	Sporting CP B	49	(6)
2025–	Sporting CP	0	(0)

International career^{‡}
2019	Portugal U15	5	(0)
2019	Portugal U16	9	(4)
2021–2022	Portugal U18	14	(2)
2023–2024	Portugal U20	4	(0)
- * Club domestic league appearances and goals as of 20 June 2026 ‡ National team caps and goals as of 20:39, 17 February 2025 (UTC)

Lucas Rodrigues Carvalho Anjos (born 7 July 2004) is a Portuguese professional footballer who plays as a forward for Liga Portugal 2 club Sporting CP B.

== Career ==
Anjos began playing football with the youth sides of União Almeirim and Académica de Santarém, before moving to the Sporting CP academy in 2015. On 21 July 2020, he signed his first professional contract with Sporting. He worked his way up their youth categories, and made his debut with the Sporting reserves in the Liga 3 for the 2023–24 season. On 8 July 2024, he extended his contract with Sporting until 2026. He made his senior and professional debut with Sporting in a 0–0 UEFA Champions League tie with Borussia Dortmund on 19 February 2025.

== International career ==
Born in Portugal, Anjos is of Brazilian descent. He is a youth product for Portugal, and was called up to the Portugal U20s for a friendly in September 2023.
