= Iván Fresneda =

Spanish footballer (born 2004)

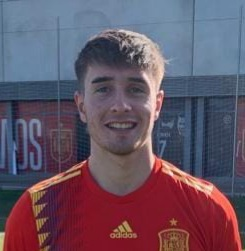
- Fresneda with Spain U18 in 2022

Personal information
- Full name: Iván Fresneda Corraliza
- Date of birth: 28 September 2004 (age 22)
- Place of birth: Madrid, Spain
- Height: 1.82 m (6 ft 0 in)
- Positions: Right-back; wing-back

Team information
- Current team: Sporting CP
- Number: 22

Youth career
- 2008–2013: Quijorna
- 2013–2014: EFMO Boadilla
- 2014–2018: Real Madrid
- 2018–2020: Leganés
- 2020–2021: Valladolid

Senior career*
Years	Team	Apps	(Gls)
2021–2022	Valladolid B	8	(0)
2022–2023	Valladolid	23	(0)
2023–	Sporting CP	56	(4)
2024	Sporting CP B	1	(0)

International career^{‡}
2022	Spain U18	2	(0)
2022–2023	Spain U19	12	(0)
2022	Spain U20	2	(0)
2025–	Spain U21	5	(1)
2026–	Spain	1	(0)
- * Club domestic league appearances and goals as of 23:30, 30 October 2026 (UTC) ‡ National team caps and goals as of 3 October 2026

Iván Fresneda Corraliza (born 28 September 2004) is a Spanish professional footballer who plays as a right-back for Primeira Liga club Sporting CP and the Spain national team.

== Club career ==
=== Early career ===
Fresneda was born in Madrid, and joined Real Madrid's La Fábrica in 2014, after representing EMFO Boadilla and Quijorna. He left the club in 2018, and spent two years at Leganés before signing for Real Valladolid in 2020.

=== Real Valladolid ===
After featuring twice with the reserves as an unused substitute, Fresneda was called up to train with the main squad by manager Pacheta in December 2021, being the first under-18 player to feature with the first team since Dani Vega in 2014. On 5 January 2022, as both Luis Pérez and Saidy Janko were unavailable, he made his professional debut with the Blanquivioletas at the age of just 17, starting in a 3–0 home loss against Real Betis in the season's Copa del Rey.

Fresneda made his La Liga debut on 9 September 2022, replacing injured Pérez in a 2–1 away loss against Girona.

=== Sporting CP ===
On 30 August 2023, Fresneda signed a five-year contract with Primeira Liga club Sporting CP, for a fee of €9 million, which could rise to €11 million with add-ons. Real Valladolid is also owed 10% of the profit Sporting receives from a future transfer. Fresneda's release clause was set at €80 million.

Fresneda made his debut for Sporting on 3 September, coming off the bench to replace Ricardo Esgaio on the final minutes of a 1–1 draw away at Braga, in the Primeira Liga. On 21 September, he made his debut on European competitions, replacing Geny Catamo on the 76th minute of a 2–1 victory away at Sturm Graz, in the UEFA Europa League. From November to February 2024, he was recovering from shoulder surgery.

== International career ==
On 3 October 2026, Fresneda made his debut for the Spain national team in a 2026–27 UEFA Nations League A game against the Czech Republic.

== Career statistics ==
=== Club ===
As of match played 30 October 2026

Appearances and goals by club, season and competition
Club	Season	League			National cup (Note: Includes Copa del Rey, Taça de Portugal)		League cup (Note: Includes Taça da Liga)		Europe		Other		Total	
Club	Season	Division	Apps	Goals	Apps	Goals	Apps	Goals	Apps	Goals	Apps	Goals	Apps	Goals
Valladolid B	2021–22	Primera Federación	8	0	—		—		—		—		8	0
Valladolid	2021–22	Segunda División	1	0	1	0	—		—		—		2	0
Valladolid	2022–23	La Liga	22	0	2	0	—		—		—		24	0
Valladolid	Total		23	0	3	0	—		—		—		26	0
Sporting CP B	2023–24	Liga 3	1	0	—		—		—		—		1	0
Sporting CP	2023–24	Primeira Liga	5	0	1	0	0	0	4 (Note: Appearances in UEFA Europa League)	0	—		10	0
Sporting CP	2024–25	Primeira Liga	18	3	7	0	3	0	3 (Note: Appearances in UEFA Champions League)	0	1 (Note: Appearance in Supertaça Cândido de Oliveira)	0	32	3
Sporting CP	2025–26	Primeira Liga	23	1	4	0	1	0	10	0	1	0	39	1
Sporting CP	2026–27	Primeira Liga	10	0	0	0	0	0	3	0	—		13	0
Sporting CP	Total		56	4	12	0	4	0	20	0	2	0	94	4
Career total			88	4	15	0	4	0	20	0	2	0	129	4

=== International ===
As of match played 3 October 2026

Appearances and goals by national team and year
National team	Year	Apps	Goals
Spain	2026	1	0
Total		1	0

== Honours ==
Sporting CP

- Primeira Liga: 2023–24, 2024–25
- Taça de Portugal: 2024–25
