= Bruno Ramos (footballer) =

Brazilian footballer

Personal information
- Full name: Bruno Cardoso Ramos de Carvalho
- Date of birth: 18 January 2005 (age 21)
- Place of birth: Alfredo Chaves, Brazil
- Height: 1.87 m (6 ft 2 in)
- Position: Centre-back

Team information
- Current team: Sporting CP B (on loan from Académico de Viseu)
- Number: 54

Youth career
- 2021–2022: Porto Vitória
- 2022–2023: Barra
- 2023–2024: Académico de Viseu

Senior career*
Years	Team	Apps	(Gls)
2024–	Académico de Viseu	0	(0)
2024–	→ Sporting CP B (loan)	24	(1)
2025	→ Sporting CP (loan)	0	(0)
- * Club domestic league appearances and goals as of 20 June 2026

Bruno Cardoso Ramos de Carvalho (born 18 January 2005) is a Brazilian professional footballer who plays as a centre-back for Sporting CP B, on loan from Académico de Viseu.

== Club career ==
Ramos is a youth product for the Brazilian clubs Porto Vitória and Barra, before moving to the academy of Académico de Viseu] on 4 July 2023 on a contract until 2028. On 31 July 2024, he joined Sporting CP B on loan in the Liga 3 with an option to buy. He made his senior and professional debut with the senior Sporting CP team as a substitute in a 2–1 win Taça de Portugal win over Portimonense on 18 October 2024. On 25 January 2025, he suffered a season-ending muscle injury on his right leg. On 17 May 2025, Sporting CP B earned promotion to the Liga Portugal 2 with his contribution.

== Honours ==
Sporting CP

- Taça de Portugal: 2024–25
