= Nico González (footballer, born 2002) =

Spanish footballer

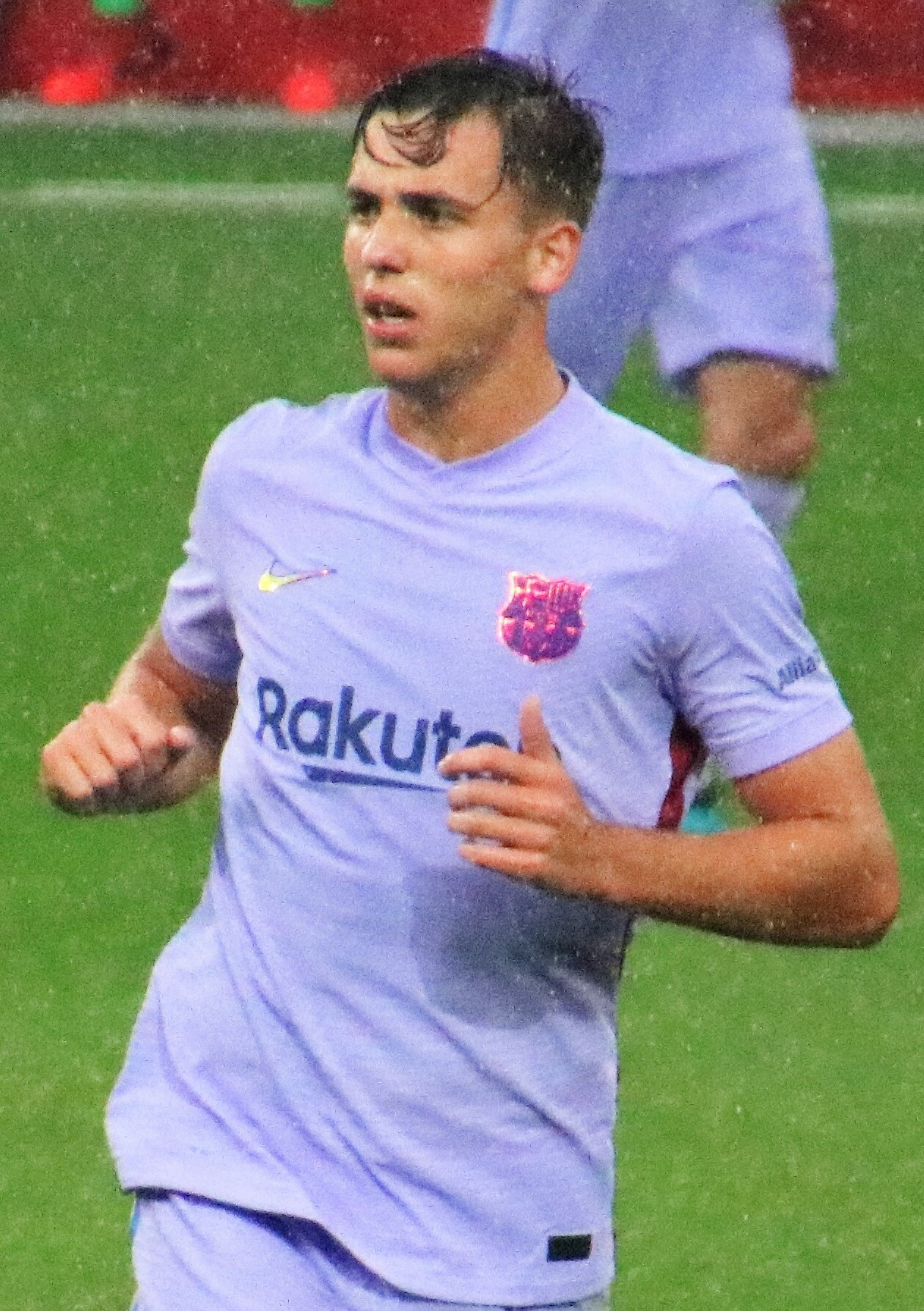
- González playing for Barcelona in 2021

Personal information
- Full name: Nicolás González Iglesias
- Date of birth: 3 January 2002 (age 24)
- Place of birth: A Coruña, Spain
- Height: 1.88 m (6 ft 2 in)
- Position: Defensive midfielder

Team information
- Current team: Newcastle United
- Number: 6

Youth career
- 2009–2013: Montañeros
- 2013–2020: Barcelona

Senior career*
Years	Team	Apps	(Gls)
2019–2022	Barcelona B	26	(0)
2021–2023	Barcelona	27	(2)
2022–2023	→ Valencia (loan)	26	(1)
2023–2025	Porto	42	(7)
2025–2026	Manchester City	36	(2)
2026–	Newcastle United	8	(0)

International career
2018–2019	Spain U17	8	(0)
2021–2024	Spain U21	11	(0)
- * Club domestic league appearances and goals as of 7 November 2026 (UTC)

Nicolás González Iglesias (born 3 January 2002), sometimes known mononymously as Nico, is a Spanish professional footballer who plays as a defensive midfielder for Premier League club Newcastle United.

== Club career ==
=== Barcelona ===
González was born in A Coruña, Galicia, and started his career with local side Montañeros at the age of seven. In December 2012, he agreed to a move to Barcelona, effective as of the following July.

On 19 May 2019, aged just 17, González made his senior debut for the reserves, coming on as a late substitute for Kike Saverio in a 2–1 Segunda División B away loss against Castellón. In the 2020–21 season, he was initially a member of the Juvenil A before starting to feature regularly for the reserve team from November 2020 onwards.

On 12 May 2021, González renewed his contract until 2024, with a €500 million buyout clause. After featuring in the main squad during the pre-season, he made his first team – and La Liga – debut on 15 August, replacing Sergio Busquets in the opening game of the 2021–22 La Liga season, a 4–2 victory against Real Sociedad.

González scored his first professional goal on 12 December 2021, netting the opener in a 2–2 away draw against Osasuna.

==== Loan to Valencia ====
On 13 August 2022, González renewed his contract until 2026 and signed with Valencia on a season-long loan.

=== Porto ===
On 29 July 2023, González signed a five-year contract with Primeira Liga club Porto, for a reported fee of €8.5 million, with Barcelona having a buy-back clause.

González made his debut for the Portuguese side on 14 August, coming off the bench to replace Romário Baró in the 70th minute of a 2–1 win away at Moreirense in the Primeira Liga. One week later, he made his first start for Porto in a 2–1 home victory against Farense.

=== Manchester City ===
On 3 February 2025, in the final hour of the winter transfer window, Premier League club Manchester City announced the signing of Nico on a four-and-a-half-year deal for a reported fee of £50 million.

On 8 February 2025, González debuted a 2–1 away victory against League One club Leyton Orient in the fourth round of the FA Cup, before coming off as a substitute with an injury 22 minutes into the first half. On 19 February, he scored his first goal for the club and in the UEFA Champions League, getting on the scoresheet in a 3–1 loss against Real Madrid at the Santiago Bernabéu, as City got knocked out of the tournament. Three months later, on 20 May, González scored his first Premier League goal in a 3–1 victory against Bournemouth.

On 9 November 2025, Nico scored his first goal of the 2025–26 season, which was the second goal against Liverpool, his second ever Premier League goal and third in total of his Manchester City career during their 3–0 win at home. On 25 April 2026, he scored the winning goal in a 2–1 victory over Southampton, securing his club's place in their fourth consecutive FA Cup final.

=== Newcastle United ===
On 26 August 2026, González signed for Newcastle United on a long-term deal. The transfer fee was reportedly £52m.

== Personal life ==
He is the son of former Spanish footballer and Deportivo La Coruña legend Fran González and the nephew of José Ramón.

== Career statistics ==
As of match played 7 November 2026

Appearances and goals by club, season and competition
Club	Season	League			National cup (Note: Includes Copa del Rey, Taça de Portugal, FA Cup)		League cup (Note: Includes Taça da Liga, EFL Cup)		Europe		Other		Total	
Club	Season	Division	Apps	Goals	Apps	Goals	Apps	Goals	Apps	Goals	Apps	Goals	Apps	Goals
Barcelona B	2018–19	Segunda División B	1	0	—		—		—		—		1	0
Barcelona B	2019–20	Segunda División B	0	0	—		—		—		0	0	0	0
Barcelona B	2020–21	Segunda División B	23	0	—		—		—		1 (Note: Appearance in Segunda División B play-offs)	0	24	0
Barcelona B	2021–22	Primera División RFEF	2	0	—		—		—		0	0	2	0
Barcelona B	Total		26	0	—		—		—		1	0	27	0
Barcelona	2021–22	La Liga	27	2	2	0	—		7 (Note: Four appearances in UEFA Champions League, three appearances in UEFA Europa League)	0	1 (Note: Appearance in Supercopa de España)	0	37	2
Valencia (loan)	2022–23	La Liga	26	1	0	0	—		—		0	0	26	1
Porto	2023–24	Primeira Liga	25	2	7	0	1	0	6 (Note: Appearance(s) in UEFA Champions League)	0	0	0	39	2
Porto	2024–25	Primeira Liga	17	5	2	0	2	0	7 (Note: Appearances in UEFA Europa League)	1	1 (Note: Appearance in Supertaça Cândido de Oliveira)	1	29	7
Porto	Total		42	7	9	0	3	0	13	1	1	1	68	9
Manchester City	2024–25	Premier League	11	1	4	0	—		1	1	1 (Note: Appearance in FIFA Club World Cup)	0	17	2
Manchester City	2025–26	Premier League	25	1	4	1	4	0	8	0	—		41	2
Manchester City	2026–27	Premier League	0	0	—		—		—		1 (Note: Appearance in FA Community Shield)	0	1	0
Manchester City	Total		36	2	8	1	4	0	9	1	2	0	59	4
Newcastle United	2026–27	Premier League	8	0	0	0	2	0	—		—		10	0
Career total			165	12	19	1	9	0	29	2	5	1	227	16

== Honours ==
Porto

- Taça de Portugal: 2023–24
- Supertaça Cândido de Oliveira: 2024

Manchester City

- EFL Cup: 2025–26
- FA Cup runner-up: 2024–25

Individual

- Primeira Liga Midfielder of the Month: December 2024
