= Sporting CP B =

Association football club in Portugal

- Full name: Sporting Clube de Portugal B
- Nicknames: Leões (Lions); Verde-e-Brancos (Green and Whites)
- Short name: Sporting B
- Founded: 2000; 26 years ago
- Ground: Estádio Aurélio Pereira
- Capacity: 1,180
- President: Frederico Varandas
- Head coach: Tiago Fernandes
- League: Liga Portugal 2
- 2025–26: Liga Portugal 2, 13th of 18
- Website: sporting.pt
Home colours	Away colours	Third colours

Sporting Clube de Portugal B, otherwise referred to as Sporting CP B, is the reserve team of Portuguese football club Sporting CP, based in Lisbon.

The reserve teams in Portugal compete in the same league system as the senior main team, instead of a reserve teams league. However, the reserve teams cannot participate in the same division as the first team, which means that Sporting CP B is not eligible for promotion to the Primeira Liga and cannot compete in the Taça de Portugal or the Taça da Liga.

Sporting CP B plays at the Estádio Aurélio Pereira in the Academia Cristiano Ronaldo, located in Alcochete, which holds a seating capacity of 1,180 spectators.

== History ==
Sporting CP B was founded in 2000 and competed in the third division of the Portuguese football league system until the end of the 2003/2004 season, when it was dissolved.

It was during this period of the B team that Cristiano Ronaldo made his domestic senior football competition debut, in a 2–1 defeat at the S.C. Lusitânia ground on 1 September 2002. His senior football debut happened on 14 August 2002, in the first team, against Inter Milan on the second leg of the third qualifying round of the UEFA Champions League.

In May 2012, the Liga Portuguesa de Futebol Profissional announced several changes to the second division of the Portuguese football league system, including an increase in the number of participating teams through the incorporation of five B teams from Primeira Liga clubs, including Sporting CP B. This change increased the number of matches to 42 per season and was implemented in the 2012/2013 season.

In their first season after returning, Sporting B finished in fourth place (all-time best position), under the management of coaches Oceano Cruz and José Dominguez.

At the start of the 2013/2014 season, Sporting B represented the club in the Taça de Honra, played at the Estádio António Coimbra da Mota, due to the first team being in the United States playing pre-season matches. After defeating SL Benfica B in the semi-final, it beat the reserve team of G.D. Estoril Praia on penalties, winning the first trophy in the team's history.

In the 2017/2018 season, the team finished in 18th place, which resulted in relegation. This performance, together with the announcement of the establishment of a national under-23 championship, a new tier, to begin in the 2018/2019 season, in which Sporting CP will participate, culminated in the decision by president Bruno de Carvalho to terminate the B team.

Fulfilling one of his election promises and taking advantage of a reorganization in the third division of the Portuguese football league system, president Frederico Varandas announced, in 2019, the reactivation of the B, which returned to competition in the following season.

In the 2020/2021 season, Sporting CP B entered directly into the Campeonato de Portugal, which, due to being replaced in the following season by Liga 3 as the third division of the Portuguese football league system, allowed 22 teams to qualify for the new competition. By finishing second in the first qualifying phase, behind Estrela da Amadora, it failed to qualify directly, which forced it to compete in the second phase, where it finished in first place, qualifying for the new competition.

In 2021/2022, it made its debut in the new national competition, Liga 3. It remained in this division until the 2024/2025 season, when, despite changing coaches three times, it managed to finish fourth in the southern zone, which allowed it to compete in the championship play-offs. The team finished in second place, behind Lusitânia F.C., earning a direct promotion spot to Liga Portugal 2.

In 2025/2026, after eight seasons, Sporting CP returned to compete in Liga Portugal 2.

== Players ==
=== Current squad ===
As of 28 August 2026

Note: Flags indicate national team as defined under FIFA eligibility rules; some limited exceptions apply. Players may hold more than one non-FIFA nationality.

No.	Pos.	Nation	Player
42	GK	SRB	Luka Petrič
74	Gk	POR	Guilherme Pires
99	GK	POR	Francisco Silva
51	GK	POR	Miguel Gouveia
93	GK	POR	Diogo Clara
68	DF	POR	Daniel Costa
45	DF	POR	Diego Coxi
84	DF	POR	Atanásio Cunha
86	DF	POR	Afonso Lee
95	DF	ESP	Lucas Taibo
56	DF	POR	Rayhan Momade
43	DF	POR	João Muniz
66	DF	POR	Miguel Alves

No.	Pos.	Nation	Player
85	DF	POR	Rafael Mota
54	DF	BRA	Bruno Ramos
50	DF	POR	Rodrigo Dias
71	DF	POR	Denílson Santos
40	MF	ARG	Mateo Tanlongo
73	MF	POR	Eduardo Felicíssimo
60	MF	POR	Catarino Pascoal
80	MF	POR	Rafael Bessugo
90	MF	POR	Paulo Simão
62	MF	NED	Ivanildo Mendes
83	MF	BEL	Zaïd Bafdili
96	MF	POR	Samuel Justo
59	MF	BRA	Kauã Oliveira
89	MF	POR	Leonardo Varela

No.	Pos.	Nation	Player
78	FW	POR	Mauro Couto
76	FW	POR	Rodrigo Rodrigues
91	FW	POR	Miguel Almeida
94	FW	PER	Víctor Guzmán
67	FW	POR	Lucas Anjos
70	FW	POR	Salvador Blopa
57	FW	POR	Chris Grombahi
82	FW	POR	Gabriel Silva
9	FW	POR	Rafael Nel
47	FW	GBS	Micael Sanhá
87	FW	CPV	Paulo Cardoso

Staff

- Head Coach: Tiago Fernandes
- Assistant Coach: Pedro Mendes
- Assistant Coach: Vítor Afonso
- Goalkeeper Coach: Dário Ezequiel
- Fitness Coach: Tomás Azevedo
- Analytics Coach: Rafael Calmeirão

== Managers List ==
- (Portugal) Jean Paul Castro (2000/2001-2001/2002; 2004)
- (Portugal) Luís Alegria (2002/2003-2003/2004)
- (Portugal) Oceano Cruz (2012)
- (Portugal) José Dominguez (2012/2013)
- (Portugal) Abel Ferreira (2013/2014)
- (Portugal) Francisco Barão (2014)
- (Portugal) João de Deus (2014-2017)
- (Portugal) Luís Martins (2017-2017/2018)
- (Portugal) Filipe Çelikkaya (2020/2021–2023/2024)
- (Portugal) João Pereira (2024; 2025)
- (Portugal) Pedro Coelho (2024-2025)
- (Portugal) João Gião (2025–2025/2026)
- (Portugal) Tiago Fernandes (2026/2027-present)
