= Romania national football team results (1940–1959) =

Win Draw Loss

This is a list of the Romania national football team results from 1940 to 1959.

== 1940 ==
31 March 1940 Danube Cup 1940	Romania	3–3	Yugoslavia	(Romania) Stadionul Republicii, Bucharest
	Bindea 25', 67'; Barátky 44'	(Report)	12', 60' Valjarević; 44' Božović	Attendance: 35,000; Referee: (Kingdom of Hungary) Rubint Lajos

14 April 1940 Friendly	Italy	2–1	Romania	(Italy) Stadio Nazionale del P.N.F, Rome
	Biavati 61'; Piola 78'	(Report)	47' Barátky	Attendance: 25,000; Referee: (Germany) Alois Beranek

19 May 1940 Danube Cup 1940	Hungary	2–0	Romania	(Hungary) Üllői út, Budapest
	György 68'; László 74'	(Report)		Attendance: 20,000; Referee: (Kingdom of Yugoslavia) Mika Popović

14 July 1940 Friendly	Germany	9–3	Romania	(Germany) Waldstadion, Frankfurt am Main
	Plener 16', 59'; Hahnemann 19', 26'; Walter 33', 76', 81'; Fiederer 58', 59'	(Report)	53', 79' Barátky; 70' Ploeşteanu	Attendance: 40,000; Referee: (Italy) Raffaele Scorzoni

22 September 1940 Danube Cup 1940	Yugoslavia	1–2	Romania	(Kingdom of Yugoslavia) Stadion Beogradski SK, Belgrade
	Petrović 17'	(Report)	41' Popescu I 51' Bogdan	Attendance: 12,000; Referee: (Italy) Generoso Dattilo

== 1941 ==
1 June 1941 Friendly	Romania	1–4	Germany	(Romania) Stadionul Republicii, Bucharest
	Niculescu 88'	(Report)	5', 67' Wilimowski; 26' Walter; 33' Kobierski	Attendance: 40,000; Referee: (Slovakia) Ján Bízik

12 October 1941 Friendly	Romania	3–2	Slovakia	(Romania) Stadionul Republicii, Bucharest
	Choumis 88'; Bindea 44', 50'	(Report)	15' Kuchár; 58' Bolček	Attendance: 15,000; Referee: (Italy) Generoso Dattilo

== 1942 ==
16 August 1942 Friendly	Germany	7–0	Romania	(Romania) Hindenburg Kampfbahn, Beuthen
	Walter 44', 49', 55'; Klingler 60'; Decker 70'; Burdenski 82'; Wilimowski 85'	(Report)		Attendance: 50,000; Referee: (Slovakia) Jozef Mohler

23 August 1942 Friendly	Slovakia	1–0	Romania	(Romania) Tehelné pole, Bratislava
	Bolček 15'	(Report)		Attendance: 20,000; Referee: (Germany) Helmut Finck

11 October 1942 Friendly	Romania	2–2	Croatia	(Romania) Stadionul ANEF, Bucharest
	F. Radu 28'; Bogdan 65'	(Report)	9' Cimermančić; 18' Wölfl	Attendance: 12,000; Referee: (Bulgaria) Todor Atanasov

== 1943 ==
13 June 1942 Friendly	Romania	2–2	Slovakia	(Romania) Stadionul Giuleşti, Bucharest
	Marian 12'; Kovacs 48'	(Report)	50' Balázsy; 88' Bolček	Attendance: 15,000; Referee: (Bulgaria) Todor Atanasov

== 1945 ==
30 September 1945 Friendly	Hungary	7–2	Romania	Budapest, Hungary
	Hidegkuti 8', 87'; Puskás 15', 69'; Zsengellér 25'; Rudas 32'; Nyers 33'	(Report)	20' Fabian; 40' Petschovschi	Stadium: Üllői út Attendance: 35000; Referee: (Hungary) Pál Hertzka

== 1946 ==
8 October 1946 1946 BC	Bulgaria	2–2	Romania	Tirana, Albania
	Negrescu 33' (aut.); Milev 22'	(Report)	40' Reuter; 88' Tóth	Stadium: Stadiumi Kombetar Qemal Stafa; Attendance: 20000; Referee: (Socialist Federal Republic of Yugoslavia) Marijan Matančić

11 October 1946 1946 BC	Romania	2–1	Yugoslavia	Tirana, Albania
	Reuter 18'; Fabian 24'	(Report)	42' Simonovski	Stadium: Stadiumi Kombetar Qemal Stafa; Attendance: 25000; Referee: (Bulgaria) Andrey Zlatarev

13 October 1946 1946 BC	Albania	1–0	Romania	Tirana, Albania
	Teliti 55'	(Report)		Stadium: Stadiumi Kombetar Qemal Stafa; Attendance: 20000; Referee: (Socialist Federal Republic of Yugoslavia) Marijan Matančić

== 1947 ==
25 May 1947 1947 BC	Albania	0–4	Romania	Tirana, Albania
		(Report)	29', 69', 79' Farkaș; 48' Kovács	Stadium: Stadiumi Kombetar Qemal Stafa; Attendance: 20000; Referee: (Hungary) Kamarás Árpád

22 June 1947 1947 BC	Romania	1–3	Yugoslavia	Bucharest, Romania
	Farkaș 42'	(Report)	37', 53' Bobek; 39' Jezerkić	Stadium: Stadionul Giulești; Attendance: 25000; Referee: (Hungary) Molnár Imre

Balkan Cup 1947	Bulgaria	2–3	Romania	Sofia, Bulgaria
	Stankov 47'; Iordanov 82'	(Report)	38' Băcuț; 59' Petschovski; 61' Marian	Stadium: Stadionul Yunak; Attendance: 25.000; Referee: (Socialist Federal Republic of Yugoslavia) Marijan Matančić

19 July 1947 Friendly	Poland	1–2	Romania	Warsaw, Poland
	Cieślik 53'	(Report)	3', 61' Spielmann	Stadium: Stadion Wojska Polskiego; Attendance: 30.000; Referee: (Czechoslovakia) Jaroslav Vlček

21 September 1947 Friendly	Romania	2–6	Czechoslovakia	Bucharest, Romania
	Spielmann 45'; Dumitrescu 59'	(Report)	8', 73' Kubala; 17', 25' Cejp; 70', 79' Šimanský	Stadium: Stadionu Giulești; Attendance: 20.000; Referee: (Poland) Maximilian Sznajder

12 October 1947 Balkan Cup 1947	Romania	0–3	Hungary	Bucharest, Romania
	Spielmann 45'; Dumitrescu 59'	(Report)	22' Egresi; 38', 83' Puskás	Stadium: Stadionul Giulești; Attendance: 25.000; Referee: (Socialist Federal Republic of Yugoslavia) Milenko Podubski

26 October 1947 Friendly	Romania	0–0	Poland	Bucharest, Romania
		(Report)		Stadium: Stadionul Giulești; Attendance: 6.000; Referee: (Hungary) Kamarás Árpád

== 1948 ==
2 May 1948 Balkan Cup 1948	Romania	0–1	Albania	Bucharest, Romania
		(Report)	63' Mirashi	Stadium: Stadionul Giulești; Attendance: 20.000; Referee: (Bulgaria) Dimitar Stoianov

6 June 1948 Balkan Cup 1948	Hungary	9–0	Romania	Budapest, Hungary
	Mészáros 30', 46'; Egresi 43', 61', 72'; Puskás 58', 82'; Kocsis 67', 85'	(Report)		Stadium: Megyeri úti Stadion; Attendance: 45.000; Referee: (Socialist Federal Republic of Yugoslavia) P. Mlinarić

20 June 1948 Balkan Cup 1948	Romania	3–2	Bulgaria	Bucharest, Romania
	Farkaș 22', 71'; Dumitrescu 78'	(Report)	14' Țvetkov; 15' Argirov	Stadium: Stadionul Giulești; Attendance: 20.000; Referee: (Hungary) György Szigeti

4 July 1948 Balkan Cup 1948	Romania	2–1	Czechoslovakia	Bucharest, Romania
	Iordache 22'; Bartha 90'	(Report)	77' Menclík	Stadium: Stadionul Giulești; Attendance: 20.000; Referee: (Poland) Maximilian Sznajder

10 October 1948 Friendly	Poland	0–0	Romania	Chorzów, Poland
		(Report)		Stadium: Stadion Ruchu; Attendance: 50.000; Referee: (Czechoslovakia) Jaroslav Vlček

24 October 1948 Balkan Cup 1948	Romania	1–5	Hungary	Bucharest, Romania
	Petschovski 77'	(Report)	44', 64', 83' Puskás; 49', 68' Deák	Stadium: Stadionul Republicii; Attendance: 40.000; Referee: (Czechoslovakia) Jaroslav Vlček

== 1949 ==
8 May 1949 Friendly	Romania	2–1	Poland	Bucharest, Romania
	Petschovski 5', 31'	(Report)	64' Mamoń	Stadium: Stadionul Republicii; Attendance: 35.000; Referee: (Hungary) György Dankó

22 May 1949 Friendly	Czechoslovakia	3–2	Romania	Prague, Czechoslovakia
	Šimanský 32', 46'; Pažický 22'	(Report)	16' Vaczi; 25' Lungu	Stadium: Great Strahov Stadium; Attendance: 55,000; Referee: (Hungary) Andor Dorogi

23 October 1949 Friendly	Romania	1–1	Albania	Bucharest, Romania
	Petschovski 23'	(Report)	50' Teliti	Stadium: Stadionul Republicii; Attendance: 40.000; Referee: (Hungary) György Dankó

29 November 1949 Friendly	Albania	1–4	Romania	Tirana, Albania
	Mirashi 50'	(Report)	22', 57' Lungu; 33' Vaczi; 68' Filotti	Stadium: Stadiumi Qemal Stafa; Attendance: 40,000; Referee: (Hungary) Ferenc Palásti

== 1950 ==
14 May 1950 Friendly	Poland	3–3	Romania	Wrocław, Poland
	Cieślik 18', 25', 76'	(Report)	15' Mercea; 47' Vaczi; 65' Bodo	Stadium: Stadion Olimpijski; Attendance: 60.000; Referee: (Hungary) Sándor Harangozó

21 May 1950 Friendly	Romania	1–1	Czechoslovakia	Bucharest, Romania
	Bodo 66'	(Report)	88' Žďárský	Stadium: Stadionul Republicii; Attendance: 40.000; Referee: (Hungary) Ferenc Palásti

8 October 1950 Friendly	Romania	6–0	Albania	Bucharest, Romania
	Petschovski 10', 18'; Rădulescu 13', 41'; Mercea 15'; Suru 80'	(Report)		Stadium: Stadionul Republicii; Attendance: 40.000; Referee: (Czechoslovakia) Jaroslav Vlček

== 1951 ==
20 May 1951 Friendly	Czechoslovakia	2–2	Romania	Prague, Czechoslovakia
	Cejp 16'; Vlk 61'	(Report)	40', 73' Vaczi	Stadium: Great Strahov Stadium; Attendance: 50,000; Referee: (Hungary) György Dankó

== 1952 ==
11 May 1952 Friendly	Romania	3–1	Czechoslovakia	Bucharest, Romania
	Paraschiva 9'; Serfözö 80'; Ozon 90'	(Report)	84' Pluskal	Stadium: Stadionul Republicii; Attendance: 45.000; Referee: (Hungary) János Pósa

25 May 1952 Friendly	Romania	1–0	Czechoslovakia	Bucharest, Romania
	Paraschiva 49'	(Report)		Stadium: Stadionul Republicii; Attendance: 40.000; Referee: (Czechoslovakia) Jaroslav Vlček

15 July 1952 1952 Summer Olympics	Hungary	2–1	Romania	Turku, Finland
	Czibor 22'; Kocsis 74'	(Report)	Suru 85'	Stadium: Kupittaan Jalkapallostadion; Attendance: 10.653; Referee: (Soviet Union) Nikolai Latîșev

26 October 1952 Friendly	Romania	3–1	East Germany	Bucharest, Romania
	Vaczi 23', 32', 48'	(Report)	Schnieke 24'	Stadium: Stadionul Republicii; Attendance: 40.000; Referee: (Poland) Frantisek Fronczik

== 1953 ==
14 June 1953 1954 WCQ	Czechoslovakia	2–0	Romania	Prague, Czechoslovakia
	Pažický 54'; Vlk 69'	(Report)		Stadium: Great Strahov Stadium; Attendance: 50,000; Referee: (Hungary) János Pósa

28 June 1953 1954 WCQ	Romania	3–1	Bulgaria	Bucharest, Romania
	Petschovski 20', 30' (pen.); Ene 82'	(Report)	53' Dobromir Tașkov	Stadium: Stadionul Republicii; Attendance: 45.000 (sau 60.000); Referee: (East Germany) Gerhard Schulz

11 October 1953 1954 WCQ	Bulgaria	1–2	Romania	Sofia, Bulgaria
	Kolev 28'	(Report)	27' Serfözö; 52' Călinoiu	Stadium: Vasil Levski National Stadium; Attendance: 40.000; Referee: (East Germany) Andor Dorogi

25 October 1953 1954 WCQ	Romania	0–1	Czechoslovakia	Bucharest, Romania
		(Report)	29' (pen.) Šafránek	Stadium: Stadionul 23 August; Attendance: 90.000; Referee: (East Germany) Gerhard Schulz

== 1954 ==
8 May 1954 Friendly	East Germany	0–1	Romania	Berlin, Germany
		(Report)	37' Ozon	Stadium: Walter Ulbricht Stadion; Attendance: 90.000; Referee: (Czechoslovakia) Jaroslav Vlček

19 September 1954 Friendly	Hungary	5–1	Romania	Budapest, Hungary
	Kocsis 21', 34'; Hidegkuti 43', 53'; Budai 67'	(Report)	22' Ozon	Stadium: Népstadion; Attendance: 93.000; Referee: (Czechoslovakia) Metoděj Charousek

== 1955 ==
29 May 1955 Friendly	Romania	2–2	Poland	Bucharest, Romania
	Ozon 9'; Georgescu 76'	(Report)	65' Hachorek; 67' Cieślik	Stadium: Stadionul 23 August; Attendance: 80.000; Referee: (Soviet Union) Nikolay Balakin

12 June 1955 Friendly	Norway	0–1	Romania	Oslo, Norvegia
		(Report)	15' Ozon	Stadium: Ullevaal; Attendance: 17.506; Referee: (Finland) Wolf Karni

12 June 1955 Friendly	Sweden	4–1	Romania	Gothenburg, Suedia
	Bengtsson 2'; Hamrin 15', 72'; Svensson 67'	(Report)	75' Georgescu	Stadium: Ullevi; Attendance: 23.266; Referee: (Denmark) Helge Andersen

18 September 1955 Friendly	Romania	2–3	East Germany	Bucharest, Romania
	Georgescu 7'; Suru 28'	(Report)	15' Wirth; 80', 90' Tröger	Stadium: Stadionul 23 August; Attendance: 90.000; Referee: (Hungary) Sándor Harangozó

28 September 1955 Friendly	Romania	1–0	Belgium	Bucharest, Romania
	Georgescu 79'	(Report)		Stadium: Stadionul 23 August; Attendance: 90.000; Referee: (Czechoslovakia) Martin Macko

9 October 1955 Friendly	Romania	1–1	Bulgaria	Bucharest, Romania
	Georgescu 32'	(Report)	65' Panaiotov	Stadium: Stadionul 23 August; Attendance: 70.000; Referee: (Austria) Carl Steiner

== 1956 ==
22 April 1956 Friendly	Yugoslavia	0–1	Romania	Belgrad, Yugoslavia
		(Report)	83' Gheorghe Cacoveanu	Stadium: Stadion Jugoslovenska Narodna Armija; Attendance: 45.000; Referee: (Italy) Giorgio Bernardi

17 June 1956 Friendly	Romania	0–2	Sweden	Bucharest, Romania
		(Report)	32' Thillberg; 57' Johansson	Stadium: Stadionul 23 August; Attendance: 80.000; Referee: (Hungary) Károly Balla

28 June 1956 Friendly	Romania	2–0	Norway	Bucharest, Romania
	Zaharia 36'; David 44'	(Report)		Stadium: Stadionul 23 August; Attendance: 60.000; Referee: (Socialist Federal Republic of Yugoslavia) Borce Nedelkovski

10 September 1956 Friendly	Bulgaria	2–0	Romania	Sofia, Bulgaria
	Milanov 53'; Ianev 85'	(Report)		Stadium: Stadionul Național Vasil Levski; Attendance: 40.000; Referee: (Greece) Vasilis Diamantopoulos

== 1957 ==
26 May 1957 Friendly	Belgium	1–0	Romania	Brussels, Belgium
	Van den Berg 40'	(Report)		Stadium: Heysel Stadium; Attendance: 23.452; Referee: (England) Alfred Bond

1 June 1957 Friendly	Soviet Union	1–1	Romania	Moscow, USSR
	Strelțov 78'	(Report)	51' Ene	Stadium: Stadionul Lujniki; Attendance: 100.000; Referee: (Sweden) Sten Ahlner

16 June 1957 Preliminariile CMF 1958	Greece	1–2	Romania	Athens, Greece
	Panakis 29'	(Report)	15' Ene; 78' Ozon	Stadium: Stadionul Panathinaikos; Attendance: 18.000; Referee: (France) Édouard Harzic

29 September 1957 Preliminariile CMF 1958	Romania	1–1	Yugoslavia	Bucharest, Romania
	Ene 78'	(Report)	52' Mujić	Stadium: Stadionul 23 August; Attendance: 68.758; Referee: (Austria) Alfred Grill

3 November 1957 Preliminariile CMF 1958	Romania	3–0	Greece	Bucharest, Romania
	Petschovski 51'; Tătaru 64'; Cacoveanu 67'	(Report)		Stadium: Stadionul 23 August; Attendance: 54.465; Referee: (France) Pierre Schwinte

17 November 1957 Preliminariile CMF 1958	Yugoslavia	2–0	Romania	Belgrad, Yugoslavia
	Milutinović 52', 78'	(Report)		Stadium: Stadion Jugoslovenska Narodna Armija; Attendance: 55.000; Referee: (Austria) Friedrich Seipelt

== 1958 ==
14 September 1958 Friendly	East Germany	3–2	Romania	Leipzig, East Germany
	Schröter 26'; Assmy 57'; Wirth 76'	(Report)	Constantin 27'; Ene 61'	Stadium: Zentralstadion; Attendance: 60.000; Referee: (Soviet Union) Nikolay Balakin

26 October 1958 Friendly	Romania	1–2	Hungary	Bucharest, Romania
	Dinulescu 30'	(Report)	76' Vasas; 77' Tichy	Stadium: Stadionul 23 August; Attendance: 90.000; Referee: (Soviet Union) Elmar Saar

2 November 1958 Preliminariile CEF 1960	Romania	3–0	Turkey	Bucharest, Romania
	Oaidă 62'; Constantin 77'; Dinulescu 81'	(Report)		Stadium: Stadionul 23 August; Attendance: 70.000; Referee: (Switzerland) Gottfried Dienst

== 1959 ==
26 April 1959 Preliminariile CEF 1960	Turkey	2–0	Romania	Istanbul, Turcia
	Lefter 13' (pen.), 54'	(Report)		Stadium: Mithatpașa Stadı; Attendance: 35.000; Referee: (Socialist Federal Republic of Yugoslavia) Boris Nedelkovski

19 July 1959 Preliminariile pentru Jocurile Olimpice de vară din 1960	Soviet Union Olimpică	2–0	Romania	Moscow, Russia
	Urin 11'; Metreveli 61'	(Report)		Stadium: Luzhniki Stadium; Attendance: 102.000; Referee: (Finland) Orja Pättiniemi

2 August 1959 1960 Olympics qual.	Romania	0–0	Soviet Union Olympics	Bucharest, Romania
		(Report)		Stadium: Stadionul 23 August; Attendance: 80.000; Referee: (Poland) Grzegorz Aleksandrowicz

30 August 1959 Friendly	Poland	2–3	Romania	Warsaw, Poland
	Pol 32', 47'	(Report)	26', 45', 55' Dridea	Stadium: Stadion Dziesięciolecia Manifestu Lipcowego; Attendance: 40.000; Referee: (Soviet Union) Nikolai Hlopotin

8 November 1959 Preliminariile pentru Jocurile Olimpice de vară din 1960	Romania	1–0	Bulgaria	Bucharest, Romania
	Constantin 80'	(Report)		Stadium: Stadionul 23 August; Attendance: 80.000; Referee: (Hungary) János Pósa
