= Albania national football team results (1946–1969) =

- Win Draw Loss

This is a list of the Albania national football team results from 1946 through 1969.

== 1940s ==
=== 1946 ===
7 October 1946 1946 Balkan Cup	Albania	2–3	Yugoslavia	Tirana, Albania
	Mirashi 6'; Teliti 8'		Matosic 49'; Bobek 52'; Cajkovski 57'	Stadium: Stadiumi Kombetar Qemal Stafa; Attendance: 20,000; Referee: Radu Istrate

9 October 1946 1946 Balkan Cup	Albania	3–1	Bulgaria	Tirana, Albania
	Boriçi 30', 65' (pen.); Mirashi 68'		Spasov 5'	Stadium: Stadiumi Kombetar Qemal Stafa; Attendance: 20,000; Referee: Radu Istrate

13 October 1946 1946 Balkan Cup	Albania	1–0	Romania	Tirana, Albania
	Teliti 55'			Stadium: Stadiumi Kombetar Qemal Stafa; Attendance: 20,000; Referee: Marijan Matančić

=== 1947 ===
25 May 1947 1947 Balkan Cup	Albania	0–4	Romania	Tirana, Albania
			Farkaș 29', 69', 79'; Kovács 48'	Stadium: Stadiumi Kombetar Qemal Stafa; Attendance: 20,000; Referee: Kamarás Árpád

15 June 1947 1947 Balkan Cup	Bulgaria	2–0	Albania	Sofia, Bulgaria
	Stankov 1', 20'			Stadium: Stadium Yunak; Attendance: 30,000; Referee: Miljenko Podubsky

20 August 1947 1947 Balkan Cup	Hungary	3–0	Albania	Sofia, Bulgaria
18:00 CEST	János 7'; Béla 25'; Deák 53'			Stadium: Üllői út Attendance: 15,000; Referee: Todor Stoyanov

14 September 1947 1947 Balkan Cup	Albania	2–4	Yugoslavia	Tirana, Albania
	Boriçi 13'; Parapani 65'		Bobek 23'; Krnić 27'; Mitić 31'; Cimermančić 44'	Stadium: Stadiumi Kombetar Qemal Stafa; Attendance: 20,000; Referee: Viktor Vrhovac

=== 1948 ===
2 May 1948 1948 Balkan Cup	Romania	0–1	Albania	Bucharest, Romania
			Mirashi 63'	Stadium: Stadionul Giuleşti; Attendance: 20,000; Referee: Todor Stoyanov

23 May 1948 1948 Balkan Cup	Albania	0–0	Hungary	Tirana, Albania
17:00 CET				Stadium: Stadiumi Kombetar Qemal Stafa; Attendance: 20,000; Referee: Leo Lemešić

27 June 1948 1948 Balkan Cup	Yugoslavia	0–0	Albania	Belgrade, Serbia
				Stadium: Stadion Beogradski S.K. Attendance: 25,000; Referee: Niko Gelev

=== 1949 ===
23 October 1949 International Friendly	Romania	1–1	Albania	Bucharest, Romania
	Pecsovszky 23'		Teliti 49'	Stadium: Stadionul Republicii; Attendance: 40,000; Referee: Dankó György

6 November 1949 International Friendly	Poland	2–1	Albania	Warsaw, Poland
12:00 CET	Cieślik 16'; Kohut 88'		Gjinali 55' (pen.)	Stadium: Stadion Wojska Polskiego; Attendance: 35,000; Referee: Jozef Nemčovský

17 November 1949 International Friendly	Bulgaria	0–0	Albania	Sofia, Bulgaria
15:00 CEST				Stadium: C.D.N.V. Stadium; Attendance: 30,000; Referee: Jaroslav Vlček

29 November 1949 International Friendly	Albania	1–4	Romania	Tirana, Albania
	Mirashi 50'		Lungu 22', 57'; Váczi 33'; Filotti 68'	Stadium: Stadiumi Kombetar Qemal Stafa; Attendance: 40,000; Referee: Palásti Ferenc

== 1950s ==
=== 1950 ===
1 May 1950 International Friendly	Albania	0–0	Poland	Tirana, Albania
14:00 CET				Stadium: Stadiumi Kombetar Qemal Stafa; Attendance: 20,000; Referee: Dankó György

4 June 1950 International Friendly	Albania	2–1	Bulgaria	Tirana, Albania
	Boriçi 21'; Biçaku 56'		Spasov 75'	Stadium: Stadiumi Kombetar Qemal Stafa; Attendance: 30,000; Referee: Jaroslav Vlček

17 September 1950 International Friendly	Czechoslovakia	3–0	Albania	Prague, Czechoslovakia
	Žďárský 4'; Cejp 72'; Hlaváček 87'			Stadium: Stadion Československé Armády; Attendance: 35,000; Referee: Pósa János

24 September 1950 International Friendly	Hungary	12–0	Albania	Budapest, Hungary
15:30 CEST	Puskás 18', 36', 75', 82'; Budai 33', 52', 60', 65'; Palotás 39', 50'; Kocsis 42', 53'			Stadium: Megyeri úti Stadion; Attendance: 38,000; Referee: Jozef Nemčovský

8 October 1950 International Friendly	Romania	6–0	Albania	Bucharest, Romania
	Pecsovszky 10', 18'; Rădulescu 13', 41'; Mercea 15'; Suru 80'			Stadium: Stadionul Republicii; Attendance: 40,000; Referee: Jaroslav Vlček

=== 1952 ===
29 November 1952 International Friendly	Albania	3–2	Czechoslovakia	Tirana, Albania
	Gjinali 2'; Teliti 43'; Jareçi 89'		Kvapil 65'; Müller 76'	Stadium: Stadiumi Kombetar Qemal Stafa; Attendance: 35,000; Referee: Constantin Mitran

7 December 1952 International Friendly	Albania	2–1	Czechoslovakia	Tirana, Albania
	Gjinali 2'; Boriçi 14'		Dvořák 31'	Stadium: Stadiumi Kombetar Qemal Stafa; Attendance: 18,000; Referee: Constantin Mitran

=== 1953 ===
29 November 1953 International Friendly	Albania	2–0	Poland	Tirana, Albania
14:00 CET	Boriçi 9'; Resmja 35'			Stadium: Stadiumi Kombetar Qemal Stafa; Attendance: 20,000; Referee: Dorogi Andor

=== 1957 ===
15 September 1957 International Friendly	China	3–2	Albania	Beijing, China
	Fan 33', 60'; Chen 74'		Ndini 17'; Kraja 64'	Stadium: Xian Nong Tan Stadium; Attendance: 40,000; Referee: Li Xhu Yan

=== 1958 ===
1 May 1958 International Friendly	Albania	1–1	East Germany	Tirana, Albania
	Kraja 6'		Tröger 88'	Stadium: Stadiumi Kombetar Qemal Stafa; Attendance: 20,000; Referee: Sipos Szilárd

== 1960s ==
=== 1963 ===
2 June 1963 1964 Summer Olympics qualification	Albania	0–1	Bulgaria	Tirana, Albania
			Dimitrov 37'	Stadium: Stadiumi Kombetar Qemal Stafa; Attendance: 15,000; Referee: Horváth Lajos

16 June 1963 1964 Summer Olympics qualification	Bulgaria	1–0	Albania	Sofia, Bulgaria
	Kotkov 30'			Stadium: National Stadium Vasil Levski; Attendance: 25,200; Referee: Dimosthenis Stathatos

29 June 1963 1964 European Nations' Cup qualification Round of 16	Denmark	4–0	Albania	Copenhagen, Denmark
17:30 CET	Petersen 16' (pen.); Madsen 35'; Clausen 40'; Enoksen 49'			Stadium: Københavns Idrætspark; Attendance: 26,640; Referee: Einar Boström

30 October 1963 1964 European Nations' Cup qualification Round of 16	Albania	1–0	Denmark	Tirana, Albania
14:30 CET	Pano 3'			Stadium: Stadiumi Kombetar Qemal Stafa; Attendance: 27,765; Referee: Joe Cassar Naudi

=== 1964 ===
24 May 1964 1966 FIFA World Cup qualification Group 5	Netherlands	2–0	Albania	Rotterdam, Netherlands
14:30 CET	Schrijvers 48' (pen.); Muller 52'			Stadium: De Kuip; Attendance: 28,745; Referee: John Meighan

11 October 1964 International Friendly	Albania	1–1	Algeria	Tirana, Albania
	Haxhiu 9'		Abdelaziz 78' (o.g.)	Stadium: Stadiumi Kombetar Qemal Stafa; Attendance: 15,000; Referee: Hysen Hysenaj

25 October 1964 1966 FIFA World Cup qualification Group 5	Albania	0–2	Netherlands	Tirana, Albania
15:00 CET			van Nee 2'; Geurtsen 87'	Stadium: Stadiumi Kombetar Qemal Stafa; Attendance: 27,579; Referee: Petar Dzhonev

=== 1965 ===
11 April 1965 1966 FIFA World Cup qualification Group 5	Albania	0–2	Switzerland	Tirana, Albania
15:00 CET			Quentin 33'; Kuhn 90' (pen.)	Stadium: Stadiumi Kombetar Qemal Stafa; Attendance: 27,291; Referee: Antonio Sbardella

2 May 1965 1966 FIFA World Cup qualification Group 5	Switzerland	1–0	Albania	Geneva, Switzerland
15:00 CET			Kuhn 10' (pen.)	Stadium: Stadiumi Kombetar Qemal Stafa; Attendance: 24,108; Referee: Adolfo Bueno Perales

7 May 1965 1966 FIFA World Cup qualification Group 5	Northern Ireland	4–1	Albania	Belfast, Northern Ireland
19:30 CET	Crossan 17', 30', 73' (pen.); Jashari 49'		Best 85'	Stadium: Windsor Park; Attendance: 16,017; Referee: Norman Mootz

24 November 1965 1966 FIFA World Cup qualification Group 5	Albania	1–1	Northern Ireland	Tirana, Albania
	Zhega 77'		Irvine 58'	Stadium: Stadiumi Kombetar Qemal Stafa; Attendance: 16,381; Referee: Petre Sotir

=== 1967 ===
8 April 1967 UEFA Euro 1968 qualification Group 4	West Germany	6–0	Albania	Dortmund, West Germany
16:00 CET	Müller 6', 25', 73', 85' (pen.); Löhr 77', 79'			Stadium: Stadion Rote Erde; Attendance: 30,000; Referee: Martti Hirviniemi

14 May 1967 UEFA Euro 1968 qualification Group 4	Albania	0–2	Yugoslavia	Tirana, Albania
16:30 CET			Zambata 22', 53'	Stadium: Stadiumi Kombetar Qemal Stafa; Attendance: 18,573; Referee: Kostakis Xanthoulis

12 November 1967 UEFA Euro 1968 qualification Group 4	Yugoslavia	4–0	Albania	Belgrade, Serbia
14:00 CET	Sprečo 44'; Osim 48', 81'; Lazarević 56'			Stadium: Stadion Jugoslovenska Narodna Armija; Attendance: 18,573; Referee: Kostakis Xanthoulis

17 December 1967 UEFA Euro 1968 qualification Group 4	Albania	0–0	West Germany	Tirana, Albania
14:00 CET				Stadium: Stadiumi Kombetar Qemal Stafa; Attendance: 21,889; Referee: Ferdinand Marschall
