= History of FC Dinamo București =

Romanian association football club

Dinamo București is a Romanian association football club based in Bucharest. The club was founded in 1948 and spent almost its entire history in Liga I, the top league of Romanian football

Dinamo is one of the two most successful football teams in Romania, having won 18 Romanian Liga I titles, 13 Romanian Cups and 2 Romanian Supercups.

== Foundation and early years ==
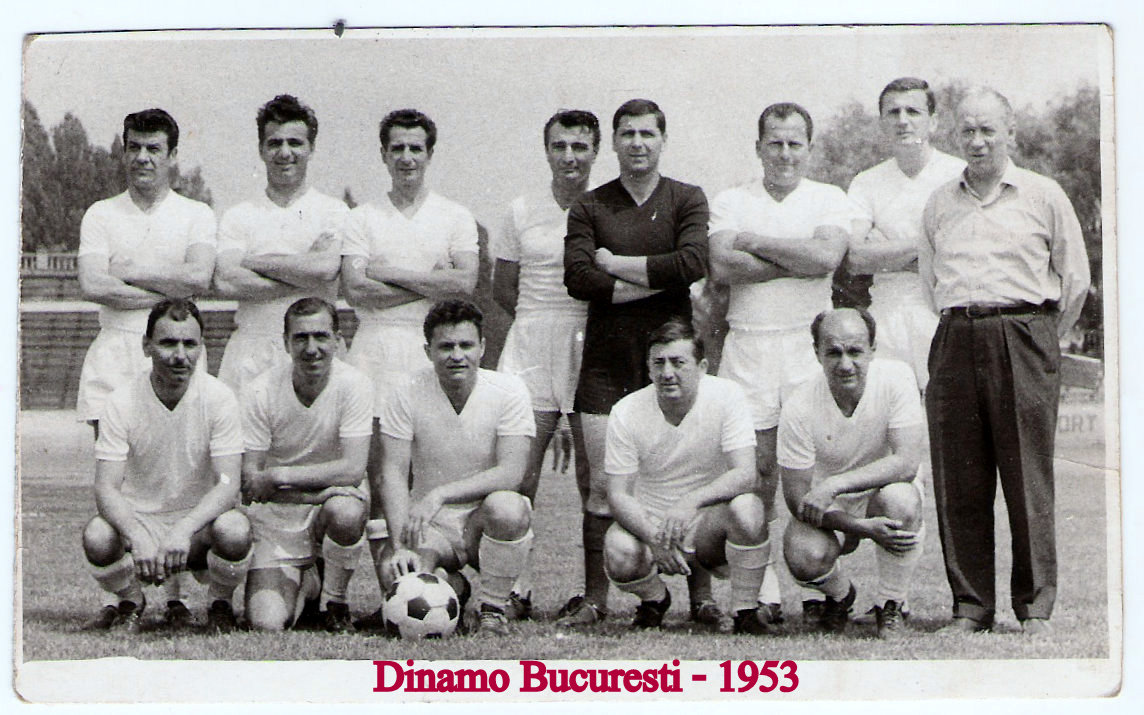
Dinamo Bucharest League runners-up in 1953

On 14 May 1948, "Unirea Tricolor MAI" — newly entered, in January 1948, under the umbrella of the Communist regime's Internal Affairs Ministry — merged with "Ciocanul București" and formed "Dinamo București", the sporting club representing the above-mentioned institution. The people who contributed at the foundation of the club were the Minister of Internal Affairs, Teohari Georgescu and the Jewish brothers Alexandru and Turi Vogl.

Until the end of the championship, Dinamo was going to be represented by two teams: "Ciocanul" ("Hammer"), named "Dinamo A" and "Unirea Tricolor MAI", known as "Dinamo B" (this last one relegating, at the end of the football season, into the Divizia B). Starting with 1950, Dinamo A was separated from Dinamo B, the latter being transferred first to Braşov, then to Cluj-Napoca, and eventually, in 1958, being moved to Bacău, where it became FCM Bacău.

The "Dinamo" name was used for the very first time on 1 May 1948. Nevertheless, the real debut of Dinamo was on the 1947–48 Divizia A edition (finishing 8th). Some of the team's players were Ambru, Angelo Niculescu, Teodorescu, Șiclovan, Bartha, Sârbu. On 14 July 1948 Dinamo played its first international match against Zidnice (Czechoslovakia): 4 to 1 for the red-whites. 22 August will remain a reference date for Dinamo's football, representing the debut of Dinamo Bucharest in the first national Division. The pioneers were, among others, Titus Ozon, Lăzăreanu, Farkaș. The team's first coach was Coloman Braun-Bogdan. At the end of the '48–'49 edition, Angelo Niculescu retires, dedicating himself to the coaching career rewarded later with great victories with Dinamo and with the national team. In 1950, new football players arrived at Dinamo: Nicolae Dumitru, Băcuț I.

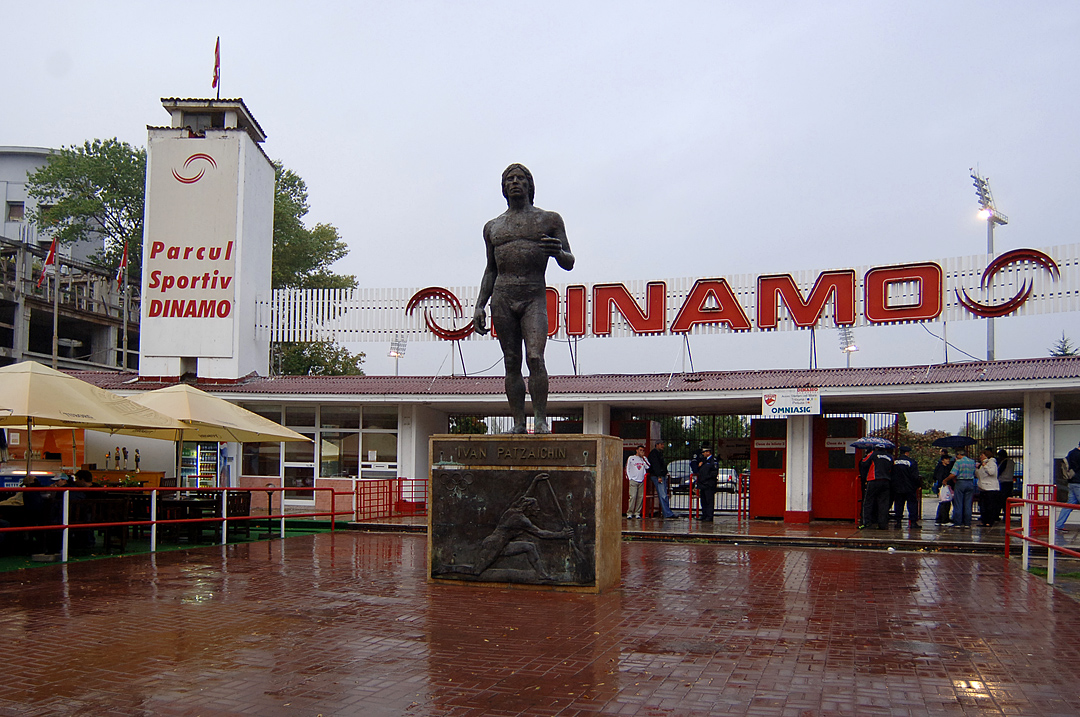
Dinamo's stadium in front is the statue of Ivan Patzaichin

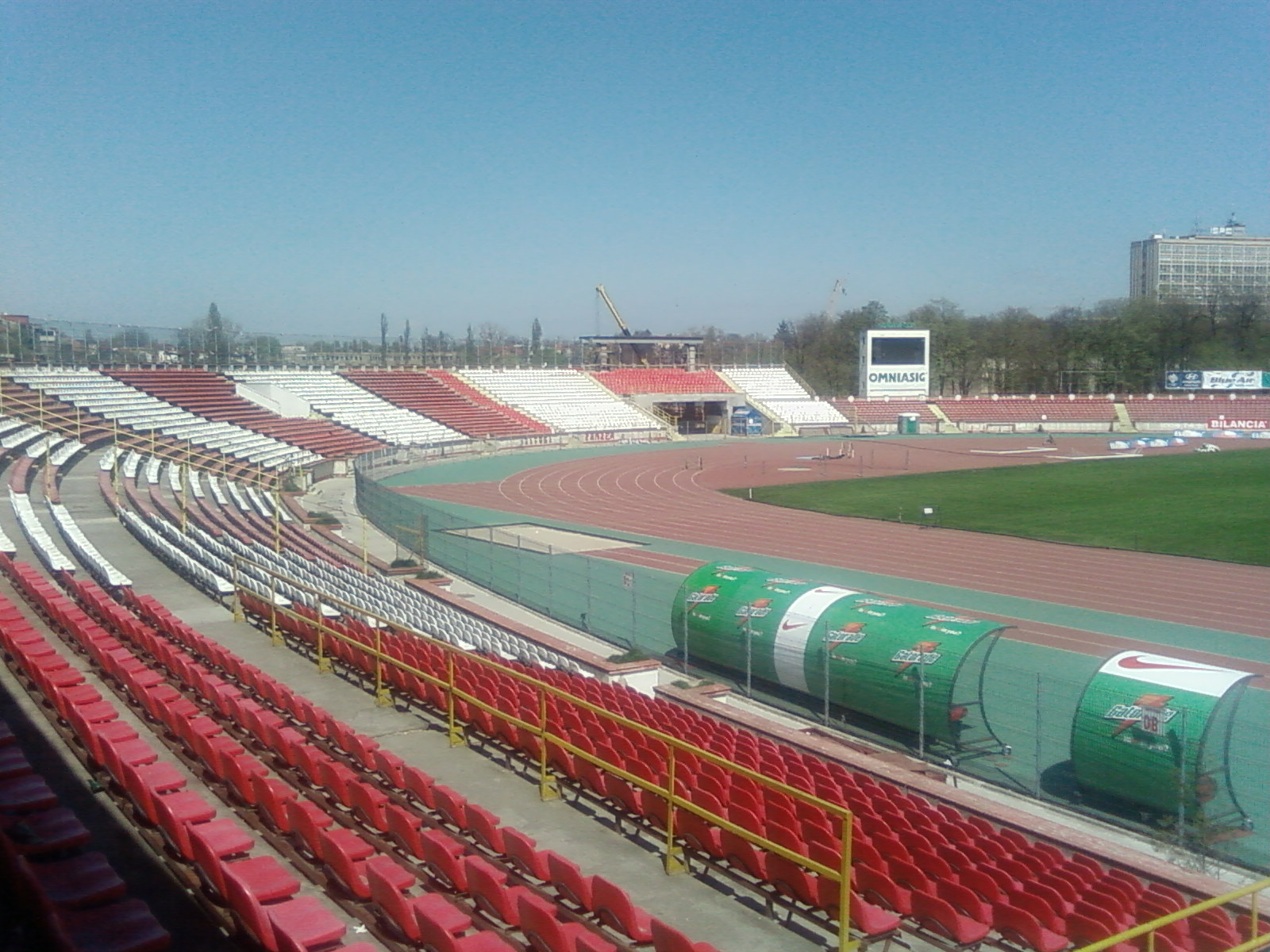
Dinamo Stadium

The current Dinamo Stadium was inaugurated on 14 October 1951. The first match: Dinamo-Locomotiva Timişoara 1–0. Dinamo finished runner-up in the 1951–52 and 1952–53 seasons. Also in 1953, Dinamo played the Final of the Romanian Cup: 0–2 with Metalul Reşiţa.

In 1955, Dinamo won their first championship. With Angelo Niculescu as head coach, Dinamo impressed mainly in the offensive, with an attack formed by Ene I, Neagu and Suru. The defense, with players like Băcuț I, Băcuț II, Szökő, Călinoiu, was the best in the championship – only 19 goals received.

In the fall of 1956, the team make its debut in the European Champion Clubs' Cup (competition created a year before). Dinamo was the first Romanian team to play in the European competitions. The debut game was played on 26 August 1956, in front of 32,000 spectators. Dinamo defeated Galatasaray with 3–1. In the second leg, Dinamo lost in Istanbul with 1–2, and moved forward.

== European successes ==
Dinamo won the second championship in 1962, with players like Datcu, Ștefan, Unguroiu (head coaches were Nicușor Dumitru și Nedelescu). In 1963, Dinamo won their third title. The team brought in that season Pârcălab, Gergely (Tr. Ionescu – Nicușor Dumitru were the head coaches). Dinamo won also the Romanian Cup in 1964, 5–3 against their biggest rival Steaua. Dinamo played in the European Cup against the famous Real Madrid (1–3 in București), a team with Di Stefano and Gento. The game played in Bucharest took place at "23 August" Stadium, and established a new record for this arena: 100,000 spectators.

In the fall of 1964, in the European Cup, Dinamo met another famous team – Inter Milan – with Facchetti, Picchi, Jair, Mazzolla, Corso and Suarez. Dinamo lost both legs, 0–6 and 0–1. In 1965, Dinamo won another championship and brought new players, Mircea Lucescu and Grozea. The following season of the European Cup, Dinamo met again Inter Milano, and managed to win the home game, 2–1. Inter won at Milano 2–0 and moved forward.

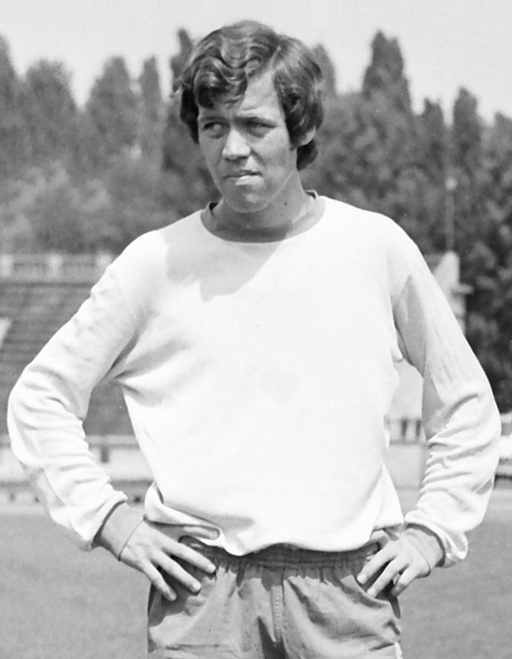
Florea Dumitrache

The 6th title: in 1971. In CCE, Dinamo eliminates Spartak Trnava, the team of Dobias, Kuna and Adamec. A new player: Florea Dumitrache. What follows is a double win against Israel's and Van Hanegem's Feyenoord: 0–3 and 0–2. The 7th title comes two years later, in 1973, when Dinamo won a game against CFR Cluj at the exact margins to pass Universitatea Craiova in the standings. In CCE, they surpass Northern Ireland's Crusaders Belfast ( The 11–0 home game against Northern Ireland's team is still the biggest margin of victory in the history of the European Cup ), but fail against Atlético Madrid (0–2 and 2–2), the team of Capon, Irueta, Heredia and Ayala. The next year Dinamo plays in the UEFA Cup and after the eliminating Bolospur, fails in the confrontation with F.C. Koln: 1–1 and 2–3!

The 8th big success was going to come in 1975, year when Dudu Georgescu receives "the golden boot" (with 32 goals). In '76 in the UEFA Cup Dinamo plays against another "sacred monster" – AC Milan – with Fabio Capello and Collovatti on its side: 0–0 and 1–2. The 1976–1977 first season brings the 9th title and a new golden boot for Dudu Georgescu (47 goals). In the autumn of '77 in the CCE, Dinamo wins a thrilling game against Atlético Madrid 2–1, but loses at Madrid, 2–0.

In the second round of the UEFA Cup (after eliminating Alki Larnaca from Cyprus) Dinamo is eliminated by Eintracht Frankfurt, team of Pezzey, Grabowsky and Holzenbein (2–0 and 0–3 in prolongation).

== Golden Years ==
The 1981–82 UEFA Cup season brings some great wins for Dinamo. The red-whites meet Levski Sofia, team of Sirakov and Iskrenov (3–0 and 1–2). In the second round, a terrifying "double": Dinamo-Internazionale (with Bergomi, Bagni, Prohaska, Altobelli, Baresi, Oriali, Marini and Beccalossi). At Milan, 1–1 (authors: Pasinato and Custov) and back home in Bucharest, 3–2 for the "dogs", in the extra time. Dinamo is eliminated by the Swedish team IFK Göteborg, which later ends up winning the trophy.

The 10th national title will be obtained in 1982, when Dinamo also conquers the Cup after a 3–2 victory against Baia Mare. After a 5-year absence, Dinamo reappears in the European Champions Cup, meeting (and eliminating) Vaaleregen Oslo. In the next stage, Dinamo had to confront a difficult opponent: the team of Vizek and Nehoda, Dukla Prague. They win at home, with 2–0, obtaining the qualification at Prague: 1–2. Dinamo is eliminated by Aston Villa, club of Bremmer, Cowans, Withe, Shaw and Morley. The 11th title come one year later, in 1983.

The 1983–1984 season began with the retirement of Cornel Dinu, winner of 6 national titles and 6 national cups, with 454 caps in the first league and 75 in the national team. Still the same year Dinamo wins the 12th title.

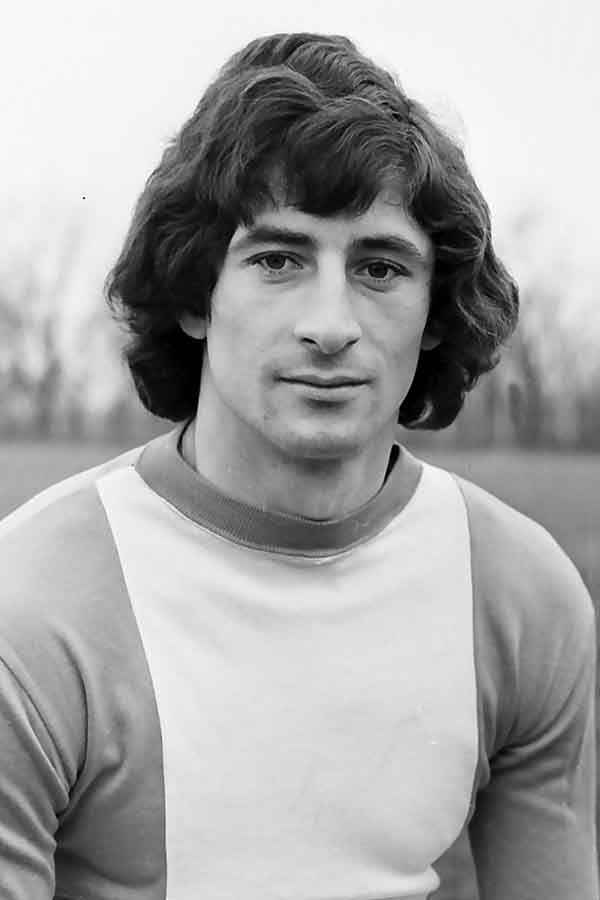
Cornel Dinu, the player with the most caps for Dinamo

The autumn of 1983–84 was going to represent a valuable step into the international arena. The "European Champions Cup campaign" started with the Finnish team, Kuusysi Lahti (1–0 and 3–0). The second round pushes Dinamo against the current champion, Hamburger SV – team of Stein, Kalz and Magath. At Bucharest, Augustin, Mulțescu and Orac score for 3–0. The thrilling second leg finishes 3–2 (goals Țălnar and Mulțescu). In order to accede in the semifinals of CCE, Dinamo had to defeat another top team: Dinamo Minsk, with Aleinikov, Zigmanatovici and Gurinovici. The first leg was 1–1 (Rednic equalizing in the 87th minute), and it was followed by a 1–0 victory at Bucharest (with Augustin scoring). Dinamo was the first Romanian team to reach the European Champions Cup semi-finals, where it met Liverpool. Dinamo lost 1–0 at Anfield in the first leg match where Graeme Souness had punched captain Lica Movila which had set up a tough match back in Romania. In the second-leg Bucharest lost 2–1 to Liverpool who went on to win the competition.

In the first round of the next European Champions Cup, in the autumn of `84, Dinamo meets Omonia Nicosia: 4–1 and 1–2. Next is the match against Girondins Bordeaux (club of Tigana, Giresse, Lacombe and Battiston), Dinamo being eliminated after 0–1 and 1–1.

In 1986 Dinamo wins the Cup against Steaua (1–0). After an 18-year break, Dinamo plays again in the Cup Winners Cup in the autumn of `86. The 1986–1987 season brings the 'golden boot' for Cămătaru (44 goals). They also lost against the Albanian team 17 Nentori Tirana.

The 1988 Romanian cup final was a special one. After Steaua players left the field at the score of 1–1 due to a claim of being robbed by the referee, Dinamo was given the trophy, but later the Romanian F.A. (bowing to pressure from the Communist Party) awarded the match 2–1 to Steaua. After the revolution of December 1989, Steaua propositioned to return the trophy to Dinamo, which refused to take it.

In the 88–89 Cup Winners Cup season, Dinamo again eliminated the Finnish team Lahti, managing to win 3–0. Next is the elimination of Scottish club Dundee United: 1–0 and 1–1 at Bucharest. However, they fail to qualify for the semifinals after losing on away goals, 1–1 and 0–0 against Sampdoria Genova.

The Cup Winners Cup 1989–1990 season brings new success. Dinamo meets Albanian team, Dinamo Tirana 0–1 and 2–0. Next is the Greek champion, Panathinaikos 2–0 and 6–1. In the quarter-finals they meet Partizan Belgrade (with Mijatovici on the field) eliminating them with 2–1 and 2–0. After six years of break, Dinamo plays a new continental semifinal this time against Anderlecht Bruxelles, losing twice with 1–0.

In the summer of 1990, Dinamo – with Mircea Lucescu as coach – conquers a new national title, the 13th. Also the team wins the Cup final, against Steaua: 6–4. The new CCE season begins with the elimination of Irish team St Patrick's Athletic Dublin (4–0 and 1–1). Dinamo is eliminated in the second round by FC Porto.

The 1991–1992 UEFA Cup Edition faces Dinamo against Figo's Sporting Clube de Portugal, qualifying after a 0–1 loss and a 2–0 victory. The next round Dinamo is eliminated by Genoa 1893: 1–3 and 2–2.

In 1992, the 14th title was added to Dinamo's record. It was a triumphal march, with 34 matches and no defeat.

== Ups and downs ==
The years to come saw Dinamo in the UEFA Cup. However, without any special results, the team leaves the competition in the first qualification round, in 1993–1994 losing to Cagliari, in 1994–95 losing to Trabzonspor, and in 1996 losing to Levski Sofia. Among the new players that play for Dinamo are: Catalin Hildan, Florentin Petre, Cosmin Contra. Alongside the famous goalkeeper Florin Prunea appear Mihalcea and Kiriță. With this new team, in the 1998–1999 season Dinamo plays arguably the best football in Romania, though the team loses the title to Rapid București. Dinamo ended the dark era of the mid-1990s this way once they started to fight for the title this year, only having to wait one more year to win it with no contender.

Dinamo played next season in the UEFA Cup beating Benfica 1–0 on Estádio da Luz, then losing a suspected game on Lia Manoliu 2–0.

Dinamo won the title in the 1999–2000 with Adrian Mutu playing for them but lost to Polonia Warszawa in the second qualification round of the UEFA Champions League 1999–00 mostly because they sold most of the players in the Summer Mercato. This affected their next season, when they lost the title to Steaua Bucharest.

In 2001–02 Dinamo won the title again after a tight championship run. Dinamo managed to win the title in the last game of the season just in front of FC National. In Europe, Dinamo played in the 2001–02 UEFA Cup eliminating Dinamo Tirana in the Qualifying round but lost in the 1st round to Grasshopper Club Zurich.

In the 2002–03 season Dinamo was affected again by the players who left the team, with it becoming a tradition for the leaders of the club to sell players after winning a title, losing the games in the UEFA Champions League and having a hard time in Divizia A. Dinamo changed a lot of managers and lost 7 consecutive games. After Ioan Andone came to the team, Dinamo played a spectacular semifinal with Astra Ploiesti. After losing 2–1 in Ploiesti in the middle of the crisis the team beat Astra in Bucharest 3–1 after extra time. They then went on to win the Romanian Cup, after beating FC National in the final 1–0 on a goal scored by Iulian Tames.

After building up a team again in 2003–04, they eliminated Shakhtar Donetsk in the first round of the UEFA Cup 2003–04 season. They went on to lose to Spartak Moscow in the second round. In the Romanian League Dinamo won the title by defeating Steaua București in a close battle. They also won the Romanian Cup after a 2–0 win over Oţelul Galaţi at Cotroceni.

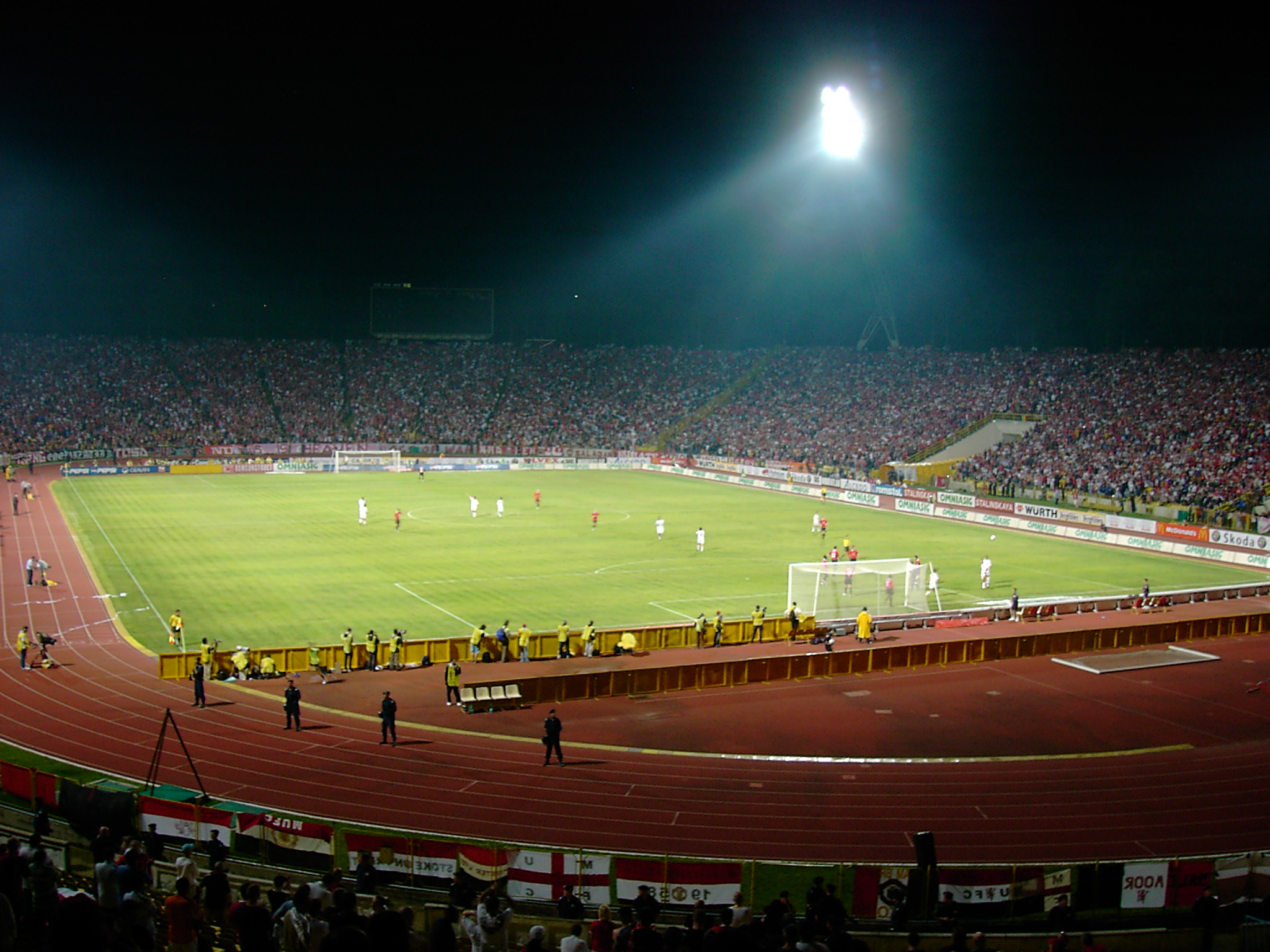
2004–05 UEFA Champions League third qualifying round match Dinamo Bucharest vs Manchester United in Bucharest (2004)

For the 2004–05 season Dinamo played a thrilling game vs. Manchester United in Bucharest, at the National Stadium, in the third qualification round of the UEFA Champions League, but lost 1–2. This game was significant because it showed a lot of progress from the last attempts to qualify for the group phase of the Champions League. The 2nd leg was lost at Old Trafford 3–0.

A highlight in recent times came in the UEFA Cup 2005-06 season when Dinamo thrashed Premier League team Everton 5–1. Dinamo went on to win the tie 5–2. Also, they managed to beat CSKA Moscow (Cup Holders) 1–0 but they missed the European Spring due to a couple of close games lost in the last few seconds. The most controversial was played at Stade Vélodrome, where Dinamo lost 2–1 against Olympique de Marseille although Octavian Chihaia scored the equalizer in the dying seconds, but the referee didn't validate the goal because he was turn towards the center of the field, preparing to end the game.

In the 2006–07 season they did qualify for the European Spring where they were eliminated by Benfica after a 0–1 loss at Da Luz and a 1–2 loss at home. Domestically, the team crushed most of its opponents in the first 19 rounds, ending up autumn champions, 13 points ahead of second place and then they secured their 18th title with four rounds to spare. The Romanian champions could have qualified directly to the Champions League group stage for the 2007–08 season, if Manchester United or Chelsea would have won the competition in the 2006–07 season. But AC Milan became champions, and Dinamo had to play a preliminary round before the group phase.

Dinamo failed again to enter the Champions League group phase, being eliminated in the third qualifying round by Lazio Roma. After four manager changes, Dinamo finished the 2007–08 season on the 4th spot in Liga I. In the summer of 2008, Mircea Rednic returned as coach having the mission to win the title and qualify Dinamo to the Champions League, but after the team finished the first part of the season as leader, they failed at the finish line and ended only third.

In the 2009–10 season, Dinamo played in the playoff for Europa League against Czech football club FC Slovan Liberec. In the first leg the supporters invaded the pitch causing the match to be abandoned in the 88th minute when the score was 2–0 for Slovan. The UEFA Control and Disciplinary Body awarded a default 0–3 defeat against Dinamo. One week later in Liberec Dinamo managed a memorable comeback and qualified in the Europa League 2009–10 group stage after winning 3–0 in Liberec after 90 and 120 minutes and winning 9–8 at penalties after 10 series. The domestic season was yet another unsuccessful one, finishing 6th in the championships.

Dinamo finished 6th the 2010–11 season and qualified for the Cup finals against Steaua, but lost due to an own goal. For the 2011–12 season, Dinamo started with a new coach, ex-Dinamo player Liviu Ciobotariu.

After a disappointing defeat against Vorskla Poltava in the Europa League Play-Off, Dinamo is leading the Romanian Championship after 10 rounds with the best offense and defense in the championship despite selling Gabriel Torje to the Italian team Udinese with only Dorel Stoica and Srdjan Luchin completing the squad for the new season.

At the end of the autumn season, Dinamo was leading the table by one point ahead of CFR Cluj and started the spring one with a 2–0 win against Gaz Metan Mediaș in the first ever game played by the Red Dogs on the Național Arena in front of a season record of 20,000 spectators that filled the first tier of the brand new stadium. Even in this circumstances, the team had a very disappointing spring run in the league and finished 5th, with 62 points in 34 matches. Still, Dinamo managed to win 2 trophies, the Romanian Cup, in a final against Rapid, qualifying in the process for the Europa League Play-off and the Romanian Super Cup against CFR Cluj.

== Changing of ownership and insolvency ==
In March 2013, businessman Ionuț Negoiță bought the club from Nicolae Badea. The 2012–13 season ended with the same team as before the changing of the ownership, but after the season, Negoiță started his moves. He appointed former Dinamo glory Gheorghe Mulțescu as head coach, bought a new president, Constantin Anghelache and a new boss for the youth academy, Gabi Răduță. Things didn't work as hoped and in September 2013, Mulțescu was sacked. The decision came because Dinamo won only nine points in the first eight rounds of the Liga I season. Mulțescu's replacement was Flavius Stoican who was promoted from the second team. With Stoican at helm, Dinamo started to climb and in March 2014, the team was close to the podium. They finished the season on the fourth spot and reached the semifinals of the Romanian Cup, where they were ousted by Steaua Bucharest.

In May 2014, Ionuț Negoiță announced that the club began the procedures to enter the insolvency. The Bucharest Court accepted the request in June 2014. Thus, the Licence Committee from the Romanian Federation decided to withdraw Dinamo's rights to enter the Europa League.

On 24 September 2015, the Bucharest Municipal Court ruled that Dinamo met the criteria to end the insolvency process. But the club wasn't able to enter the European competitions, thus, despite ending the season on the 4th position, Dinamo didn't participate in the Europa League.

In the 2016–17 Liga I season, Dinamo finished third in the play-off and qualified for the Europa League. In the 2017–18 UEFA Europa League season, Dinamo met the Spanish club Athletic Bilbao, in the third qualifying round. The first match, in Bucharest, ended 1-1, with the Brazilian Rivaldinho scoring for Dinamo. But Athletic won the second match 3-0 and Dinamo was eliminated.

The following two seasons in Liga I, Dinamo failed to qualify for the play-off and missed the European cups.

== Troubled times ==
Each failure Dinamo had to make the play-offs for three consecutive seasons they relegated (2018 to 2020). After the ninth place in 2019, Dinamo entered the battle against relegation in the 2019–20 Liga I season. Ionuț Negoiță wanted to sell the club, serious offers were wanting but the fan's association bought 20% of the club's shares. Adrian Mihalcea was named head-coach in March 2020, but made his debut in June, after the COVID-19 lockdown. Mihalcea began his tenure with four losses in the first four games in charge and Dinamo reached bottom in the championship. On 5 July, Dinamo won against Academica Clinceni and hauled themselves off the bottom position but stayed in the relegation zone. The next game ended in a at home draw against Politehnica Iași. Mihalcea was sacked, after only seven games in charge. Gheorghe Mulțescu came back as Dinamo's head coach, for the fourth time.

Dinamo was again affected by coronavirus. Six players tested positive on 16 July and the entire team was again quarantined for five days, until the next set of tests.[10]? Other four players tested positive the next two days. On 22 July, the number of infected players rose to 18.

On 6 August, the Liga I season was frozen and Dinamo did not play all its postponed games, finishing the season in 13th place. But the club was spared from relegation after the Romanian Federation decided to increase the number of teams in Liga I from 14 to 16. Thus, only the 14th place played a relegation/promotion play-off against the third place in Liga II.

On 13 August 2020, the club was purchased by Benel International SA, a Spanish company represented by Pablo Cortacero. The new owners promised to bring back Dinamo Bucharest to the European cups. Dinamo transferred several contract-free players with impressive resumes and big salaries. Cosmin Contra came as head coach and footballers like Borja Valle, Aleix Garcia, and Juan Camara arrived with salaries of up to 33,000 euros per month. But Dinamo had a poor start of the season and the new owner, Pablo Cortacero, did not transfer any money to the players for several months. Almost all the foreign players submitted their memoirs so that they could leave free. Some parted ways amicably, and others complained at FIFA to recover their salaries. Dinamo was left with huge debts, of approximately 7 million euros, and at the beginning of the 2021–2022 season the club went into insolvency again.

== Relegation and promotion ==
The 2021–22 season ended with a relegation to Liga II. Dinamo ended 14th the regular season and the play-out, then played the promotion/relegation play-off against Universitatea Cluj, third place in Liga II. Universitatea Cluj won the first match, 2–0 at Cluj Arena. The second leg, at Dinamo stadium, ended 1-1. Thus, Dinamo Bucharest relegated for the first time in its history.

In March 2022, the businessman Dorin Șerdean became the majority shareholder of Dinamo after an agreement to take over the club from Pablo Cortacero. In February 2023, Şerdean accepted the offer received from the Red&White company to sell the club. The owners of Red&White are Andrei Nicolescu, who owns 60% of the company, and Eugen Voicu, who owns 40%. The administrator of Red&White is Dorin Iacob, the father of Vlad Iacob, the special administrator of Dinamo.

Ovidiu Burcă was named head coach on 21 July 2022. With a completely changed squad, Burcă didn't have the best start, with two wins and five losses in the first seven games. From then, until the end of the regular season, Dinamo suffered only one loss and reached the play-off. After another four wins and only three losses in the ten play-off games, Dinamo finished fourth and made it to the Liga I promotion/relegation play-off.

On 29 May, Dinamo defeated FC Arges Pitesti with a whopping 6–1 in the first play-off leg. Then, Dinamo tasted defeat in the 2nd leg with a 4–2, a record breaking play-off with loads of goals, 8–5 in aggregate, which took Dinamo back to the Superliga after just one year of staying in the Liga II.

== Second insolvency procedure ==
Dinamo has faced a second insolvency procedure, due to severe financial difficulties. The club entered insolvency in 2021. These financial troubles stem from significant debts, including those owed to private firms owned by the club's own shareholders. The club's financial woes have been further complicated by legal issues, such as tax evasion cases involving former executives. The club also faced a transfer ban from FIFA due to its debts.

In June 2025, Dinamo had emerged from insolvency, the decision being made by the Bucharest Court. Following this decision, Dinamo will have the right to participate in European cups starting with the 2026/2027 season. Dinamo qualified for the playoffs in 2024-25 season, but were unable to compete for a Conference League spot due to the lack of a UEFA license.
