= Gheorghe Lăzăreanu =

Romanian footballer

Personal information
- Date of birth: 6 May 1924
- Place of birth: Gherla, Romania
- Position: Goalkeeper

Senior career*
Years	Team	Apps	(Gls)
1940–1941	Ripensia Timișoara	1	(0)
1945–1946	Carmen București		
1946–1947	Ciocanul București	22	(0)
1947–1948	ASA București	10	(0)
1948–1949	Dinamo București	7	(0)
1948–1949	Flacăra București	5	(0)
Total		45	(0)

International career
1946–1947	Romania	4	(0)
- * Club domestic league appearances and goals

Gheorghe Lăzăreanu (born 6 May 1924, date of death unknown) was a Romanian footballer who played as a goalkeeper.

== Club career ==
Gheorghe Lăzăreanu played for Ripensia Timișoara, Carmen București, Ciocanul București, ASA București, Dinamo București and Flacăra București, ending his career at 26 years old, choosing to work in constructions. He was the first player that played for both rival teams, ASA București and Dinamo București. On 21 November 1948 he played in the first ever CSCA București - Dinamo București derby.

== International career ==
Gheorghe Lăzăreanu played four matches for Romania, making his debut on 8 October 1946 under coach Virgil Economu in a 2–2 against Bulgaria at the 1946 Balkan Cup.

Scores and results table. Romania's goal tally first:

International appearances
App	Date	Venue	Opponent	Result	Competition
1.	8 October 1946	Tirana, Albania	Bulgaria	2–2	1946 Balkan Cup
2.	11 October 1946	Tirana, Albania	Yugoslavia	2–1	1946 Balkan Cup
3.	13 October 1946	Tirana, Albania	Albania	0–1	1946 Balkan Cup
4.	25 May 1947	Tirana, Albania	Albania	4–0	1947 Balkan Cup
