= Balkan Cup =

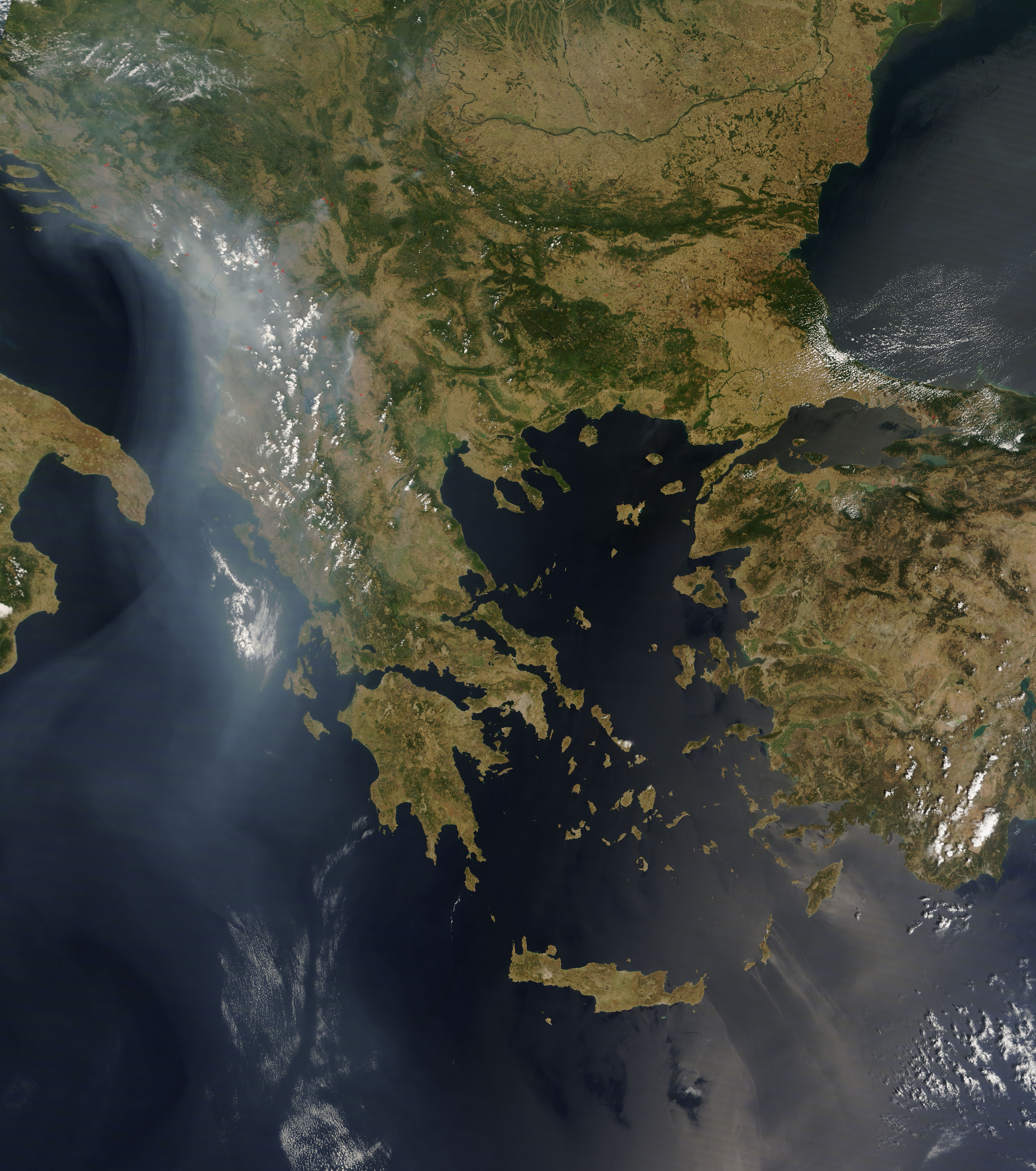
- The Balkan region of Europe, seen from space
- Founded: 1929
- Abolished: 1980
- Region: Balkans (UEFA)
- Teams: 3 to 7 teams
- Last champions: Romania
- Most championships: Romania (4 titles)

The Balkan Cup (officially Coupe Balkanique de Football) (Note: Albanian: Kupa e Ballkanit; Bulgarian: Балканска национална купа, romanized: Balkanska nacionalna kupa; Greek: Βαλκανικό Κύπελλο Εθνών Ποδοσφαίρου, romanized: Valkanikó Kýpello Ethnón Podosfaírou; Croatian: Kup Balkana za nogometne reprezentacije; Hungarian: Labdarúgó-Balkán-bajnokság; Polish: Puchar bałkański w piłce nożnej; Romanian: Cupa Balcanilor; Serbian: Балкански куп у фудбалу за репрезентације, romanized: Balkanski kup u fudbalu za reprezentacije; Turkish: Balkan Kupası) was an international association football competition contested on and off from 1929 to 1980 by countries from the Balkans region. The most successful team was Romania, with four titles.

== Overview ==
The first edition featured Romania, Greece, Yugoslavia and Bulgaria and was played over three years from 1929 to 1931. All teams played each other twice, home and away, and were awarded 2 points for a win and 1 point for a draw, with final ranking table determining the winner. Romania won the first title with a game in hand after beating Yugoslavia 4–2.

In the following tournaments the system saw significant changes, with teams playing each other only once, and instead of taking three years to complete it was shortened to just a single week. From 1932 to 1936 the competition was played every year with the same four teams until the outbreak of World War II.

After a seven-year hiatus due to World War II, the competition was revived in 1946. Greece dropped out of the tournament the same year, and was replaced by Albania, who went on to win the 1946 edition by defeating Romania 1–0 in the final game. In 1947 Hungary entered the tournament and won it in its first attempt. Hungary were a world footballing power at the time and proved this with a 9–0 thrashing against Bulgaria. In 1948 the Balkan Cup was expanded to seven teams with Poland and Czechoslovakia joining the tournament. However, the 1948 edition was never completed for unknown reasons. Hungary were topping the group at the time of its cancellation. Because of the expansions, the 1947 and 1948 tournaments were officially renamed Balkan and Central European Championship.

The competition was not played again until 1973 when a round robin group system was replaced by a knockout system with semi-finals and finals, played over three years. This time only four countries took part – Romania, Bulgaria, Turkey and Greece. Bulgaria won the final on away goals against Romania in 1976. In 1977 the second edition of the revived tournament was launched, this time consisting of five teams with Yugoslavia returning to take part. Romania went on to win the last edition in 1980 by beating Yugoslavia 4–1 at home in the final.

== Winners ==
#	Season	Champions (titles)	Runners-up	Third place	Top scorer(s)	
#	Season	Champions (titles)	Runners-up	Third place	Player(s) (Country)	Goals
1	1929–31	Romania (1)	Yugoslavia	Greece	Iuliu Bodola (Romania); Rudolf Wetzer (Romania)	7
2	1931	Bulgaria (1) ‡	Turkey	Yugoslavia	Asen Panchev (Bulgaria)	3
3	1932	Bulgaria (2)	Yugoslavia ‡	Romania	Aleksandar Živković (Yugoslavia)	5
4	1933	Romania (2) ‡	Yugoslavia	Bulgaria	Gheorghe Ciolac (Romania); Ștefan Dobay (Romania)	4
5	1934–35	Yugoslavia (1)	Greece ‡	Romania	Aleksandar Tirnanić (Yugoslavia); Aleksandar Tomašević (Yugoslavia)	3
6	1935	Yugoslavia (2)	Bulgaria ‡	Greece	Ljubomir Angelov (Bulgaria)	6
7	1936	Romania (3) ‡	Bulgaria	Greece	Sándor Schwartz (Romania)	4
8	1946	Albania (1) ‡	Yugoslavia	Romania	Loro Boriçi (Albania); Qamil Teliti (Albania); Nicolae Reuter (Romania); Božidar Sandić (Yugoslavia)	2
9	1947	Hungary (1)	Yugoslavia	Romania	Ferenc Deák (Hungary)	5
10	1948	Competition abandoned in November 1948 after 16 matches played with Hungary on top of the table.			Ferenc Puskás (Hungary)	5
11	1973–76	Bulgaria (3)	Romania	—N/a Greece / Turkey	Cemil Turan (Turkey)	4
12	1977–80	Romania (4)	Yugoslavia	—N/a Greece / Bulgaria	Anghel Iordănescu (Romania)	6

== Medals (1929-1980) ==
Exclude 1948 Balkan Cup. Exclude semifinal losers in 1973–76 Balkan Cup and 1977–80 Balkan Cup.

Rank	Nation	Gold	Silver	Bronze	Total
1	Romania	4	1	4	9
2	Bulgaria	3	2	1	6
3	Yugoslavia	2	6	1	9
4	Albania	1	0	0	1
4	Hungary	1	0	0	1
6	Greece	0	1	3	4
7	Turkey	0	1	0	1
Totals (7 entries)		11	11	9	31

== All-time top goalscorers ==
Rank	Name	Team	Goals	Tournament(s)
1	(Romania) Iuliu Bodola	Romania	15	1929-31(7), 1932(1), 1933(2), 1934-35(2), 1935(1), 1936(2)
2	(Bulgaria) Ljubomir Angelov	Bulgaria	14	1929-31(1), 1931(1), 1932(2), 1934-35(2), 1935(6), 1936(2)
3	(Kingdom of Yugoslavia) Aleksandar Živković	Yugoslavia	10	1932(5), 1933(3), 1935(2)
3	(Bulgaria) Asen Panchev	Bulgaria	10	1929-31(1), 1931(3), 1932(2), 1934-35(2), 1936(2)
5	(Hungary) Ferenc Deak	Hungary	9	1947(5) and 1948(4)
5	(Kingdom of Yugoslavia) Blagoje Marjanović	Yugoslavia	9	1929-31(4), 1931(1), 1934-35(1) and 1935(3)
5	(Romania) Gheorghe Ciolac	Romania	9	1929-31(1), 1932(1), 1933(4), 1934-35(2), 1936(1)
5	(Bulgaria) Asen Peshev	Bulgaria	9	1929-31(3), 1931(1), 1932(2), 1934-35(1), 1935(2)
8	(Hungary) Ferenc Puskas	Hungary	8	1947(3) and 1948(5)
8	(Romania) Anghel Iordanescu	Romania	8	1973-76(2) and 1977-80(6)
8	(Romania) Ștefan Dobay	Romania	8	1929-31(1), 1933(4), 1934-35(1), 1936(2)
8	(Bulgaria) Mihail Lozanov	Bulgaria	8	1929-31(1), 1931(2), 1932(1), 1934-35(1), 1935(2), 1936(1)
13	(Romania) Rudolf Wetzer	Romania	7	1929-31(7)
13	(Greece) Kostas Choumis	Greece	7	1934-35(1), 1935(4), 1936(2)

== Managers with most wins ==
Manager	Wins	Editions	Notes
(Romania) Constantin Rădulescu	3	1929–1931, 1933, 1936	Rădulescu won 3 titles with Romania
(Germany) Otto Faist	2	1931, 1932	Otto Faist won 2 titles with Bulgaria
(Romania) Ştefan Kovács	1	1977–80	
(Bulgaria) Stoyan Ormandzhiev	1	1973–76	Ormandzhiev took over from Hristo Mladenov in 1974
(Socialist Federal Republic of Yugoslavia) Ljubiša Broćić	1	1946	Broćić won it with Albania
(Kingdom of Yugoslavia) Boško Simonović	1	1935	Simonović won it with Yugoslavia
(Kingdom of Yugoslavia) Ivo Šuste (Kingdom of Yugoslavia) Mata Miodragović (Kingdom of Yugoslavia) Petar Pleše	1	1934–35	Šuste, Miodragović, Pleše were joint managers
(Hungary) Tibor Gallowich	1	1947	Gallowich was also Hungary's manager in the abandoned 1948 edition

== Titles by national team ==
Country	Winners	Runners-up
Romania	4	1
Bulgaria	3	2
(Socialist Federal Republic of Yugoslavia) Yugoslavia	2	6
Hungary	1	–
Albania	1	–
Greece	–	1
Turkey	–	1

== Participations ==
Country	No	Editions
Bulgaria	12	1929-1931, 1931, 1932, 1933, 1934-35, 1935, 1936, 1946, 1947, 1948, 1973-76, 1977-80
Romania	11	1929-1931, 1932, 1933, 1934-35, 1935, 1936, 1946, 1947, 1948, 1973-76, 1977-80
(Socialist Federal Republic of Yugoslavia) Yugoslavia	10	1929-1931, 1931, 1932, 1933, 1934-35, 1935, 1946, 1947, 1948, 1977-80
Greece	8	1929-1931, 1932, 1933, 1934-35, 1935, 1936, 1973-76, 1977-80
Turkey	3	1931, 1973-76, 1977-80
Albania	3	1946, 1947, 1948
Hungary	2	1947, 1948
Poland	1	1948
Czechoslovakia	1	1948

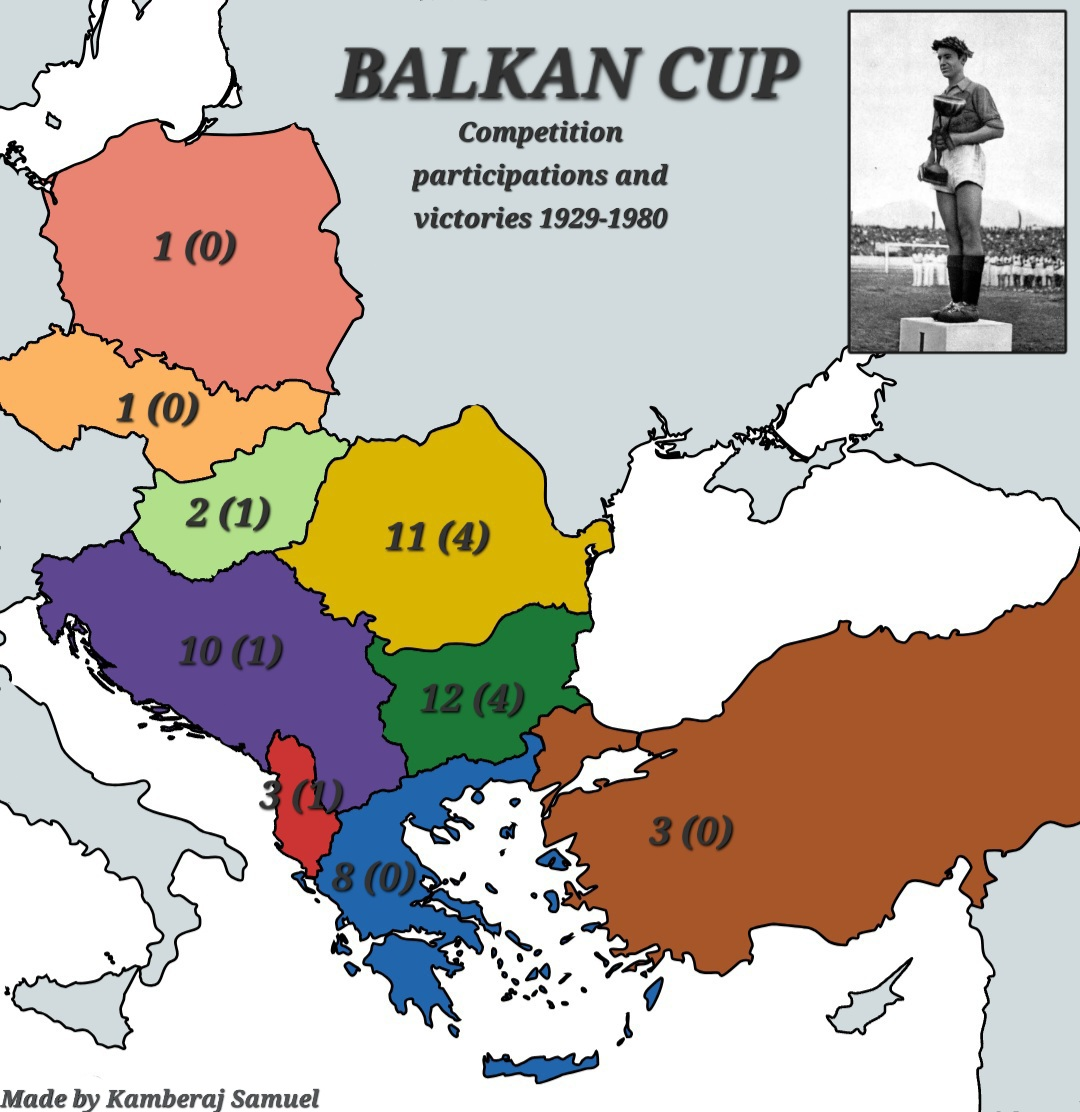
Balkan cup competition participations and victories

== Hat-tricks ==
Since the first official tournament in 1929–31, 17 hat-tricks have been scored in over 50 matches of the 12 editions of the tournament. The first hat-trick was scored by Rudolf Wetzer of Romania, playing against Greece on 25 May 1930; and the last was by Anghel Iordănescu 50 years later, on 27 August 1980, when he netted a hat-trick for Romania in the second leg of the 1977–80 final in a 4-1 win over Yugoslavia. The record number of hat-tricks in a single Balkan Cup is four, during the inaugural edition. The only player to have scored more than one hat-trick is Ljubomir Angelov, both at the 1935 Balkan Cup, in which he was the top goal scorer with those 6 goals. The record for the most goals scored in a single Balkan Cup game is 5, which has been achieved once: by Rudolf Wetzer when he scored 5 for Romania in a 8-1 win over Greece. Romania also holds the record for most hat-tricks scored with 5, being closely followed by Hungary and Yugoslavia with 4 each. Bulgaria and Greece jointly hold the record for most hat-tricks conceded with 6 each, which means that only 5 hat-tricks have been scored against a team other than Bulgaria and Greece.

=== List ===
Balkan Cup hat-tricks
#	Player	G	Time of goals	For	Goals	Result	Against	Tournament	Date	FIFA report
1.	Rudolf Wetzer	5	8', 34', 75', 76', 80'	Romania	1–1, 2–1, 5–1, 6–1, 8–1	8–1	Greece	1929-31 Balkan Cup	25 May 1930	Report
2.	Antonis Tsolinas	4	4', 50', 51', 60'	Greece	1–0, 4–0, 5–0, 6–0	6–1	Bulgaria	1929-31 Balkan Cup	7 December 1930	Report
3.	Aleksandar Tomašević	3	38', 75', 83'	Yugoslavia	2–0, 3–1, 4–1	4–1	Greece	1929-31 Balkan Cup	15 March 1931	Report
4.	Iuliu Bodola	3	13', 18', 84'	Romania	1–0, 2–0, 4–2	4–2	Greece	1929-31 Balkan Cup	29 November 1931	Report
5.	Slavko Kodrnja	3	12', 20', 72'	Yugoslavia	1–1, 2–1, 4–2	5–3	Greece	1933 Balkan Cup	3 June 1933	Report
6.	Gheorghe Ciolac	3	57', 61', 66'	Romania	3–0, 4–0, 6–0	7–0	Bulgaria	1933 Balkan Cup	4 June 1933	Report
7.	Mirko Kokotović	3	10', 54', 75'	Yugoslavia	1–0, 3–0, 4–0	4–0	Bulgaria	1933 Balkan Cup	7 June 1933	Report
8.	Ljubomir Angelov	3	26', 28', 63'	Bulgaria	2–1, 3–1, 4–1	5–2	Greece	1935 Balkan Cup	16 June 1935	Report
9.	Ljubomir Angelov (2)	3	25', 28', 66'	Bulgaria	1–2, 2–2, 3–2	3–3	Yugoslavia	1935 Balkan Cup	24 June 1935	Report
10.	Iuliu Farkaș	3	29', 69', 79'	Romania	1–0, 3–0, 4–0	4–0	Albania	1947 Balkan Cup	25 May 1947	Report
11.	Ferenc Deák	4	15', 34', 52', 79'	Hungary	1–0, 2–0, 7–0, 8–0	9–0	Bulgaria	1947 Balkan Cup	17 August 1947	Report
12.	Nándor Hidegkuti	3	47', 50', 86'	Hungary	4–0, 6–0, 9–0	9–0	Bulgaria	1947 Balkan Cup	17 August 1947	Report
13.	Béla Egresi	3	43', 61', 72'	Hungary	2–0, 5–0, 7–0	9–0	Romania	1948 Balkan Cup	6 June 1948	Report
14.	Ferenc Puskás	3	44', 64', 83'	Hungary	1–0, 3–0, 5–1	5–1	Romania	1948 Balkan Cup	24 October 1948	Report
15.	Cemil Turan	3	47', 66', 86'	Turkey	2–1, 4–2, 5–2	5–2	Bulgaria	1973-76 Balkan Cup	18 April 1973	Report
16.	Vahid Halilhodžić	3	33', 58', 84'(pen.)	Yugoslavia	1–1, 3–1, 4–1	4–1	Greece	1977-80 Balkan Cup	15 November 1978	Report
17.	Anghel Iordănescu	3	21', 55'(pen.), 79'(pen.)	Romania	1–0, 3–0, 4–1	4–1	Yugoslavia	1977-80 Balkan Cup	27 August 1980	Report

== See also ==
- Balkans Cup
- Balkan Youth Championship
- Baltic Cup
- Central European International Cup
- Central European Football League
- Mitropa Cup
- Latin Cup
- Mediterranean Cup
- Valeriy Lobanovskyi Memorial Cup
- Balkans Cup (rugby league)
- Balkan Boxing Championship
- Balkan Kickboxing Championship
- Balkan Wrestling Championship
- Balkan Swimming Championship
- Balkan Bodybuilding Championship
- Balkan Chess Championship
- UEFA Euro 2024 Group F - Record Discipline Cards
