= 1946 Balkan Cup =

Kupa e Ballkanit 1946 (in Albanian)
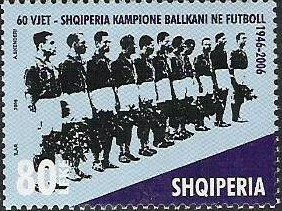
- Albanian stamp issued in 2007 commemorating the 60th anniversary of Albania's victory in the 1946 Balkan Cup

Tournament details
- Host country: Albania
- Dates: 7–13 October 1946
- Teams: 4
- Venue(s): Qemal Stafa Stadium, Tirana

Final positions
- Champions: Albania (1st title)
- Runners-up: Yugoslavia

Tournament statistics
- Matches played: 6
- Goals scored: 20 (3.33 per match)
- Attendance: 130,000 (21,667 per match)
- Top scorer(s): Five players (2 goals each)
- Best player: (Bulgaria) Bozhin Laskov

The 1946 Balkan Cup was the 8th edition of this tournament. The participanting teams were Yugoslavia, Bulgaria, Romania and for the first time ever, Albania, who ended up winning the tournament in their first try.

== Squads ==
- The four men's national teams involved in the tournament were required to register a squad of over 14 players, including one or two goalkeepers.
- The age listed for each player is on 7 October 1946, the first day of the tournament.
- The club listed is the club for which the player last played a competitive match prior to the tournament.

=== Albania ===
Albania
- Coach: (Socialist Federal Republic of Yugoslavia) Ljubiša Broćić

The following players were called up to participate in the tournament.

Caps and goals as before start of the tournament, otherwise after the match against Montenegro on 22 September 1946.

No.	Pos.	Player	Date of birth (age)	Caps	Goals	Club
	GK	Dodë Tahiri	27 November 1918 (aged 27)	1	0	(Albanian Football Federation) Vllaznia Shkodër
	GK	Giacomo Poselli	22 July 1922 (aged 24)	1	0	(Albanian Football Federation) Flamurtari Vlorë
	DF	Xhavit Demneri	1 January 1919 (aged 27)	0	0	(Albanian Football Federation) Partizani Tirana
	DF	Rexhep Spahiu	21 January 1923 (aged 23)	0	0	(Albanian Football Federation) 17 Nentori Tiranë
	DF	Muhamet Dibra	31 October 1923 (aged 22)	1	0	(Albanian Football Federation) Vllaznia Shkodër
	DF	Bahri Kavaja	23 August 1924 (aged 22)	0	0	(Albanian Football Federation) Vllaznia Shkodër
	DF	Besim Fagu	10 March 1925 (aged 21)	0	0	(Albanian Football Federation) 17 Nentori Tiranë
	MF	Bimo Fakja	1 January 1919 (aged 27)	1	0	(Albanian Football Federation) Vllaznia Shkodër
	MF	Sllave Llambi	26 June 1919 (aged 27)	1	0	(Albanian Football Federation) 17 Nentori Tiranë
	MF	Vasif Biçaku	2 March 1922 (aged 24)	1	0	(Albanian Football Federation) 17 Nentori Tiranë
	MF	Aristidh Parapani	1 January 1926 (aged 20)	0	0	(Albanian Football Federation) 17 Nentori Tiranë
	FW	Qamil Teliti	9 July 1922 (aged 24)	1	2	(Albanian Football Federation) Besa Kavajë
	FW	Loro Boriçi	4 August 1922 (aged 24)	1	0	(Albanian Football Federation) Vllaznia Shkodër
	FW	Pal Mirashi	13 December 1925 (aged 20)	1	0	(Albanian Football Federation) Vllaznia Shkodër

=== Bulgaria ===
Bulgaria
- Coach: (Bulgaria) Todor Konov

No.	Pos.	Player	Date of birth (age)	Caps	Goals	Club
	GK	Simeon Kostov	15 March 1917 (aged 29)	0	0	(Bulgarian Football Union) Lokomotiv Sofia
	DF	Liubomir Petrov	10 January 1913 (aged 33)	7	0	(Bulgarian Football Union) Levski Sofia
	DF	Stoyan Ormandzhiev	10 January 1920 (aged 26)	4	0	(Bulgarian Football Union) Lokomotiv Sofia
	DF	Stoyu Nedyalkov	29 January 1913 (aged 33)	3	0	(Bulgarian Football Union) Lokomotiv Sofia
	DF	Ivan Radoev	9 September 1901 (aged 45)	0	0	(Bulgarian Football Union) Sportist
	DF	Ivan Dimchev	22 February 1921 (aged 25)	0	0	(Bulgarian Football Union) Chavdar
	DF	Traycho Petkov	4 September 1923 (aged 23)	0	0	(Bulgarian Football Union) Lokomotiv Sofia
	MF	Krum Milev	11 June 1915 (aged 31)	7	1	(Bulgarian Football Union) Lokomotiv Sofia
	MF	Aleksandar Popov	1 October 1920 (aged 26)	0	0	(Bulgarian Football Union) Lokomotiv Sofia
	MF	Dragan Georgiev	13 May 1922 (aged 24)	0	0	(Bulgarian Football Union) Lokomotiv Sofia
	MF	Stefan Bozhkov	20 September 1923 (aged 23)	0	0	(Bulgarian Football Union) Sportist
	FW	Vasil Spasov	30 December 1919 (aged 26)	1	0	(Bulgarian Football Union) Levski Sofia
	FW	Bozhin Laskov	15 February 1922 (aged 24)	0	0	(Bulgarian Football Union) Levski Sofia
	FW	Trendafil Stankov	14 July 1923 (aged 23)	0	0	(Bulgarian Football Union) Septemvri Sofia

=== Romania ===
Romania
- Coach: (Romania) Virgil Economu

No.	Pos.	Player	Date of birth (age)	Caps	Goals	Club
	GK	Gheorghe Lăzăreanu	6 May 1924 (aged 22)	0	0	(Romanian Football Federation) Ciocanul București
	DF	Alexandru Negrescu	unknown	5	0	(Romanian Football Federation) Ciocanul București
	DF	Francisc Mészáros	5 May 1919 (aged 27)	0	0	(Romanian Football Federation) ITA Arad
	MF	Nicolae Simatoc	1 May 1920 (aged 26)	5	0	(Romanian Football Federation) Carmen București
	MF	Iosif Petschovschi	2 July 1921 (aged 25)	1	1	(Romanian Football Federation) ITA Arad
	MF	Iosif Ritter	2 December 1921 (aged 24)	1	0	(Romanian Football Federation) CFR Timișoara
	MF	Gheorghe Băcuț	12 July 1927 (aged 19)	1	0	(Romanian Football Federation) ITA Arad
	MF	Mátyás Tóth	1 April 1918 (aged 28)	0	0	(Romanian Football Federation) ITA Arad
	FW	Nicolae Reuter	6 December 1914 (aged 31)	8	0	(Romanian Football Federation) CFR Timișoara
	FW	Bazil Marian	7 November 1922 (aged 23)	7	1	(Romanian Football Federation) Carmen București
	FW	Francisc Spielmann	10 July 1916 (aged 30)	3	1	(Romanian Football Federation) Libertatea Oradea
	FW	Sever Coracu	2 October 1920 (aged 26)	1	0	(Romanian Football Federation) Universitatea Cluj
	FW	Eugen Iordache	30 April 1922 (aged 24)	0	0	(Romanian Football Federation) Juventus București
	FW	Iosif Fabian	10 August 1923 (aged 23)	0	0	(Romanian Football Federation) Carmen București

=== Yugoslavia ===
Yugoslavia
- Coach: (Socialist Federal Republic of Yugoslavia) Milorad Arsenijević and (Socialist Federal Republic of Yugoslavia) Aleksandar Tirnanić

No.	Pos.	Player	Date of birth (age)	Caps	Goals	Club
	GK	Zvonko Monsider	11 May 1920 (aged 26)	2	0	(Football Association of Yugoslavia) Dinamo Zagreb
	GK	Franjo Šoštarić	1 August 1919 (aged 27)	0	0	(Football Association of Yugoslavia) Partizan
	DF	Miroslav Brozović	26 August 1917 (aged 29)	4	0	(Football Association of Yugoslavia) Partizan
	DF	Kiril Simonovski	19 October 1915 (aged 30)	2	0	(Football Association of Yugoslavia) Partizan
	DF	Ivica Horvat	16 July 1926 (aged 20)	2	0	(Football Association of Yugoslavia) Dinamo Zagreb
	DF	Dragutin Lojen	19 May 1919 (aged 27)	1	0	(Football Association of Yugoslavia) Dinamo Zagreb
	DF	Miomir Petrović	1 December 1922 (aged 23)	0	0	(Football Association of Yugoslavia) Red Star Belgrade
	MF	Aleksandar Atanacković	29 April 1920 (aged 26)	1	0	(Football Association of Yugoslavia) Partizan
	MF	Franjo Rupnik	5 May 1921 (aged 25)	1	0	(Football Association of Yugoslavia) Partizan
	MF	Zlatko Čajkovski	24 November 1923 (aged 22)	1	0	(Football Association of Yugoslavia) Partizan
	MF	Prvoslav Mihajlović	13 April 1921 (aged 25)	0	0	(Football Association of Yugoslavia) Partizan
	FW	Frane Matošić	25 November 1918 (aged 27)	9	0	(Football Association of Yugoslavia) Hajduk Split
	FW	Franjo Wölfl	18 May 1918 (aged 28)	4	0	(Football Association of Yugoslavia) Dinamo Zagreb
	FW	Stjepan Bobek	3 December 1923 (aged 22)	2	0	(Football Association of Yugoslavia) Partizan
	FW	Božidar Sandić	26 October 1922 (aged 23)	0	0	(Football Association of Yugoslavia) Metalac

== Table ==
Pos	Team	Pld	W	D	L	GF	GA	GD	Pts	
1	Albania (C)	3	2	0	1	6	4	+2	4	Winners
2	Yugoslavia	3	2	0	1	6	5	+1	4	
3	Romania	3	1	1	1	4	4	0	3	
4	Bulgaria	3	0	1	2	4	7	−3	1	

Updated to match(es) played on 13 October 1946. Source: EU-Football.info
Rules for classification: Rules for classification: 1) points; 2) goal difference; 3) number of goals scored
(C) Champions

== Results ==
7 October 1946

Albania	2–3	Yugoslavia
Mirashi 6'; Teliti 8'	Report	Matošić 47'; Bobek 48'; Čajkovski 78'

Qemal Stafa Stadium, Tirana
Attendance: 20,000
Referee: Radu Istrate (Romania)

8 October 1946

Bulgaria	2–2	Romania
Negrescu 33' (o.g.); Milev 22'	Report	Reuter 40'; Tóth 88'

Qemal Stafa Stadium, Tirana
Attendance: 20,000
Referee: Marijan Matančić (Yugoslavia)

9 October 1946

Albania	3–1	Bulgaria
Boriçi 30', 65' (pen.); Mirashi 68'	Report	Spasov 5'

Qemal Stafa Stadium, Tirana
Attendance: 20,000
Referee: Radu Istrate (Romania)

11 October 1946

Romania	2–1	Yugoslavia
Reuter 18'; Fabian 24'	Report	Simonovski 42'

Qemal Stafa Stadium, Tirana
Attendance: 25,000
Referee: Andrey Zlatarev (Bulgaria)

13 October 1946

Albania	1–0	Romania
Teliti 55'	Report

Qemal Stafa Stadium, Tirana
Attendance: 20,000
Referee: Marijan Matančić (Yugoslavia)

13 October 1946

Bulgaria	1–2	Yugoslavia
Laskov 88'	Report	Sandić 35', 70'

Qemal Stafa Stadium, Tirana
Attendance: 25,000
Referee: Qazim Dervishi (Albania)

== Winner ==
1946 Balkan Cup

Albania
First title

== Statistics ==
=== Goalscorers ===
There were 20 goals scored in 6 matches, for an average of 3.33 goals per match.

2 goals

- (Albania) Pal Mirashi
- (Albania) Loro Boriçi
- (Albania) Qamil Teliti
- (Romania) Nicolae Reuter
- (Socialist Federal Republic of Yugoslavia) Božidar Sandić

1 goal

- (Bulgaria) Bozhin Laskov
- (Bulgaria) Krum Milev
- (Bulgaria) Vasil Spasov
- (Socialist Federal Republic of Yugoslavia) Frane Matošić
- (Socialist Federal Republic of Yugoslavia) Kiril Simonovski
- (Socialist Federal Republic of Yugoslavia) Stjepan Bobek
- (Socialist Federal Republic of Yugoslavia) Zlatko Čajkovski
- (Romania) Iosif Fabian
- (Romania) Mátyás Tóth

1 own goal

- (Romania) Alexandru Negrescu (against Bulgaria)
