= Mátyás Tóth =

Hungarian–Romanian footballer

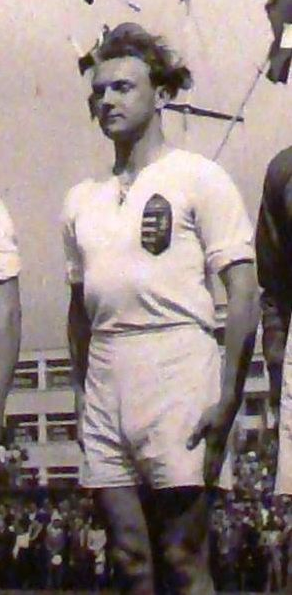

Personal information
- Date of birth: 1 April 1918
- Place of birth: Békés, Austria-Hungary
- Date of death: 12 February 2002 (aged 83)
- Place of death: Halmstad, Sweden
- Height: 1.68 m (5 ft 6 in)
- Position: Forward

Senior career*
Years	Team	Apps	(Gls)
1936–1941	Újpest	65	(21)
1938–1939	→ Phöbus (loan)	24	(9)
1941–1944	Nagyváradi AC	89	(43)
1944	Nemzeti Vasas	9	(6)
1945–1946	Carmen București		
1946–1947	ITA Arad	24	(13)
1947–1949	Vasas	44	(9)
Total		255	(101)

International career^{‡}
1939–1948	Hungary	16	(6)
1946	Romania	2	(1)

Managerial career
- 1951–1955: Köpings
- 1956: Örnsköldsvik
- 1957–1959: Bodens
- 1960: Eskilstuna
- 1961–1962: Oddevold
- 1962–1963: Mo-Domsjö
- 1963–1964: Mora
- 1964–1965: Halmia
- * Club domestic league appearances and goals as of 5 November 2019 ‡ National team caps and goals as of 5 November 2019

Mátyás Tóth (also known as Mátyás Tóth III; 1 April 1918 – 12 February 2002) was a Hungarian–Romanian footballer who played as a forward for teams such as Újpest, Nagyváradi AC, ITA Arad or Vasas, among others.

== Club career ==
Tóth was born on 1 April 1918 in Békés, Austria-Hungary and began playing football at Újpest. He made his Nemzeti Bajnokság I debut on 30 August 1936 under coach Béla Jánossy in a 3–0 away loss to Budai 11. On 11 October, he scored his first goal in the competition in a 4–3 victory against Hungária. Tóth played four matches in the 1937 Mitropa Cup, scoring one goal to help Újpest get past Venus București in the opening round, before exiting in the quarter-finals against Austria Wien. Subsequently, Tóth spent the 1938–39 season playing for Phöbus, managing to score a hat-trick in an 11–0 win over Zuglói, after which he returned to Újpest. He then played in a 4–0 loss to Građanski in the 1940 Mitropa Cup quarter-finals.

In 1941, Tóth joined Nagyváradi AC, where in his first season, he scored a career-best 17 goals. He helped the club win the 1943–44 title by contributing 14 goals in 30 matches under coach Ferenc Rónay. Shortly after winning the title, Tóth went to play for Nemzeti Vasas. Subsequently, in 1945 he played for a short while for Romanian side Carmen București. He then joined ITA Arad, making his Divizia A debut on 25 August 1946 in a 5–1 away win over Libertatea Oradea. In his single season spent with ITA, Tóth helped them win the championship, working with three coaches, Zoltán Opata, Zoltán Blum and Gusztáv Juhász, under whom he played 24 games and scored 13 goals. He returned to Vasas in 1947. There, he made his last Nemzeti Bajnokság I appearance in a 2–1 loss to Szombathelyi Haladás, totaling 231 appearances with 83 goals in the competition.

== International career ==
Tóth played 16 matches for Hungary, scoring six times, making his debut on 22 October 1939 under coach Dénes Ginzery in a 1–1 friendly draw against Romania in which he scored his side's goal.

In 1946, Tóth played two games for Romania in the Balkan Cup, even though he did not have Romanian citizenship. He scored a goal in his first match under coach Virgil Economu in a 2–2 draw against Bulgaria.

Afterwards, he returned to play for Hungary, and his first game was a 3–0 away victory against Romania during the 1947 Balkan Cup. Tóth's last five games for The Magyars were in the 1948 Balkan Cup in which he scored once in a 6–2 win over Poland. In his last game, he captained the team in a 1–0 away loss to Bulgaria. Tóth was also part of Hungary's squad in the 1936 Summer Olympics, but he did not play in any matches.

== Managerial career ==
Tóth coached several modest teams in Sweden such as Köpings, Örnsköldsvik, Bodens, Eskilstuna, Oddevold, Mo-Domsjö, Mora and Halmia.

== Later life and death ==
In 1949 after communism took over Hungary, Tóth left the country and fled to Italy. The Hungarian Football Federation suspended him for life, thus ending his career at age 31 even though he had offers to play for A.S. Roma and Lazio Roma. As a fugitive, he was placed in a camp where his health was negatively affected by improper living conditions. To escape his situation, Tóth decided to ask Crown Prince Gustaf VI Adolf of Sweden for help. He had met the Prince in September 1943 before a Hungary away game against Sweden. At that time, knowing the prince would shake the players' hands, Tóth had made an effort to learn some Swedish phrases so he could talk to him. He wrote a letter to him, explaining his situation. In it, he falsely stated that he was Protestant, despite actually being Catholic. He also attached a picture of himself. Three weeks later the prince sent him money and an airplane ticket to go to Sweden.

Tóth remained in Sweden until the end of his life. He coached a few modest teams and organized the Swedish prison championship. He died on 12 February 2002 at the age of 83 in Halmstad.

== Career statistics ==
Appearances and goals by national team and year
National team	Year	Apps	Goals
Hungary	1939	2	2
Hungary	1941	1	0
Hungary	1942	2	1
Hungary	1943	5	2
Hungary	1947	1	0
Hungary	1948	5	1
Total		16	6
Romania	1946	2	1
Total		2	1

=== International goals ===
Scores and results list Romania's and Hungary's goal tally first, score column indicates score after each Tóth goal.

List of international goals scored by Mátyás Tóth
#	Date	Venue	Opponent	Score	Result	Competition
Hungary goals
1	22 October 1939	Stadionul ANEF, Bucharest, Romania	Romania	1–0	1–1	Friendly match
2	12 November 1939	Stadion Beogradski S.K., Belgrade, Yugoslavia	Yugoslavia	2–0	2–0	Friendly match
3	1 November 1942	Üllői úti Stadion, Budapest, Hungary	Switzerland	3–0	3–0	Friendly match
4	15 September 1943	Helsingin Olympiastadion, Helsinki, Finland	Finland	1–0	3–0	Friendly match
5	15 September 1943	Helsingin Olympiastadion, Helsinki, Finland	Finland	3–0	3–0	Friendly match
6	15 September 1948	Stadion Wojska Polskiego, Warsaw, Poland	Poland	5–2	6–2	1948 Balkan Cup
Romania goals
1	8 October 1946	Qemal Stafa Stadium, Tirana, Albania	Bulgaria	2–2	2–2	1946 Balkan Cup

== Honours ==
Nagyváradi AC

- Nemzeti Bajnokság I: 1943–44

ITA Arad

- Divizia A: 1946–47
