= 1948 Balkan Cup =

1948 Balkan and Central European Championship
Tournament details
- Dates: 4 April – 7 November 1948
- Teams: 7

Tournament statistics
- Matches played: 16
- Goals scored: 48 (3 per match)
- Top goal scorer: (Hungary) Ferenc Puskás (5 goals)

The 1948 Balkan Cup, officially called the Balkan and Central European Championship, was played between April and November 1948 between Albania, Romania, Bulgaria, Yugoslavia, Hungary, Poland and Czechoslovakia. It was Poland and Czechoslovakia's first and only participation in the tournament, which was not completed. Hungary was leading the table at the time it was abandoned.

== Final standings ==
| Pos | Team | Pld | W | D | L | GF | GA | GD | Pts |
|---|---|---|---|---|---|---|---|---|---|
| 1 | Hungary | 6 | 4 | 1 | 1 | 22 | 5 | +17 | 9 |
| 2 | Yugoslavia | 3 | 2 | 1 | 0 | 4 | 1 | +3 | 5 |
| 3 | Bulgaria | 5 | 2 | 1 | 2 | 6 | 7 | −1 | 5 |
| 4 | Romania | 6 | 2 | 1 | 3 | 6 | 18 | −12 | 5 |
| 5 | Albania | 3 | 1 | 2 | 0 | 1 | 0 | +1 | 4 |
| 6 | Poland | 5 | 1 | 2 | 2 | 6 | 9 | −3 | 4 |
| 7 | Czechoslovakia | 4 | 0 | 0 | 4 | 3 | 8 | −5 | 0 |

== Matches ==
4 April 1948

| Bulgaria | 1–1 | Poland |
|---|---|---|
| Stankov 18' | Report | Parpan 23' |

Yunak Stadium, Sofia
Attendance: 30,000
Referee: Miljenko Podubsky (Yugoslavia)

18 April 1948

| Poland | 3–1 | Czech Republic |
|---|---|---|
| Cieślik 7'; Gracz 15'; Spodzieja 83' | Report | Kokštejn 58' |

Stadion Wojska Polskiego, Warsaw
Attendance: 40,000
Referee: Nikolay Latyshev (Soviet Union)

2 May 1948

| Romania | 0–1 | Albania |
|---|---|---|
| | Report | Mirashi 63' |

Stadionul Giulești, Bucharest
Attendance: 20,000
Referee: Todor Stoyanov (Bulgaria)

23 May 1948

| Albania | 0–0 | Hungary |
|---|---|---|
| | Report |

Qemal Stafa Stadium, Tirana
Attendance: 20,000
Referee: Leo Lemešić (Yugoslavia)

23 May 1948

| Hungary | 2–1 | Czechoslovakia |
|---|---|---|
| Egresi 16'; Deák 73' | Report | Schubert 81' |

Üllői út, Budapest
Attendance: 32,000
Referee: Marijan Matančić (Yugoslavia)

This match between Hungary and Czechoslovakia also counted for the 1948–53 Central European International Cup.

6 June 1948

| Hungary | 9–0 | Romania |
|---|---|---|
| Mészáros 30', 46'; Egresi 43', 61', 72'; Puskás 58', 82'; Kocsis 67', 85' | Report |

Megyeri úti Stadion, Újpest
Attendance: 45,000
Referee: Antun Mlinarić (Yugoslavia)

20 June 1948

| Romania | 3–2 | Bulgaria |
|---|---|---|
| Farkaș 22', 71' (pen.); Dumitrescu 78' | Report | Argirov 14'; Tsvetkov 21' |

Stadionul Giulești, Bucharest
Attendance: 20,000
Referee: Szigeti György (Hungary)

27 June 1948

| Yugoslavia | 0–0 | Albania |
|---|---|---|
| | Report |

Stadion Beogradski S.K., Belgrade
Attendance: 25,000
Referee: Nikola Gelev (Bulgaria)

4 July 1948

| Bulgaria | 1–3 | Yugoslavia |
|---|---|---|
| Argirov 32' | Report | Wölfl 41'; Mitić 54'; Čajkovski 72' |

Yunak Stadium, Sofia
Attendance: 30,000
Referee: Constantin Iliescu (Romania)

4 July 1948

| Romania | 2–1 | Czechoslovakia |
|---|---|---|
| Iordache 22'; Bartha 90' (pen.) | Report | Menclík 77' |

Stadionul Giulești, Bucharest
Attendance: 20,000
Referee: Maksymilian Schneider (Poland)

25 August 1948

| Poland | 0–1 | Yugoslavia |
|---|---|---|
| | Report | Mitić 24' |

Stadion Wojska Polskiego, Warsaw
Attendance: 38,000
Referee: Jozef Nemčovský (Czechoslovakia)

29 August 1948

| Bulgaria | 1–0 | Czechoslovakia |
|---|---|---|
| Milev 37' | Report |

Yunak Stadium, Sofia
Attendance: 30,000
Referee: Constantin Iliescu (Romania)

10 September 1948

| Poland | 2–6 | Hungary |
|---|---|---|
| Kohut 37'; Cieślik 68' | Report | Bozsik 20'; Hidegkuti 25', 81'; Szusza 29'; Deák 69'; Tóth 72' |

Stadion Wojska Polskiego, Warsaw
Attendance: 40,000
Referee: Jaroslav Vlček (Czechoslovakia)

10 October 1948

| Poland | 0–0 | Romania |
|---|---|---|
| | Report |

Stadion Ruchu, Chorzów
Attendance: 50,000
Referee: Jaroslav Vlček (Czechoslovakia)

24 October 1948

| Romania | 1–5 | Hungary |
|---|---|---|
| Pecsovszky 77' | Report | Puskás 44', 64', 83'; Deák 49', 68' |

Stadionul Republicii, Bucharest
Attendance: 40,000
Referee: Jaroslav Vlček (Czechoslovakia)

7 November 1948

| Bulgaria | 1–0 | Hungary |
|---|---|---|
| Milanov 15' | Report |

Yunak Stadium, Sofia
Attendance: 35,000
Referee: Constantin Iliescu (Romania)

== Matches not played ==
(note: it is uncertain which teams were meant to at home and which away)

- Yugoslavia v. Hungary
- Yugoslavia v. Romania
- Albania v. Bulgaria
- Albania v. Poland
- Albania v. Czechoslovakia

Aside from these, Hungary played Romania twice.

== Statistics ==
=== Goalscorers ===
There were 48 goals scored in 16 matches, for an average of 3 goals per match.

5 goals

- (Hungary) Ferenc Puskás

4 goals

- (Hungary) Ferenc Deák
- (Hungary) Béla Egresi

2 goals

- (Hungary) Nándor Hidegkuti
- (Hungary) József Mészáros
- (Hungary) Sándor Kocsis
- (Bulgaria) Petar Argirov
- (Poland) Gerard Cieślik
- (Socialist Federal Republic of Yugoslavia) Rajko Mitić
- (Romania) Iuliu Farkaș

1 goal

- (Albania) Pal Mirashi
- (Bulgaria) Borislav Tsvetkov
- (Bulgaria) Dimitar Milanov
- (Bulgaria) Krum Milev
- (Bulgaria) Trendafil Stankov
- (Socialist Federal Republic of Yugoslavia) Franjo Wölfl
- (Socialist Federal Republic of Yugoslavia) Željko Čajkovski
- (Poland) Józef Kohut
- (Poland) Henryk Spodzieja
- (Poland) Mieczysław Gracz
- (Poland) Tadeusz Parpan
- (Hungary) Ferenc Szusza
- (Hungary) József Bozsik
- (Hungary) Mátyás Tóth
- (Czechoslovakia) Julius Schubert
- (Czechoslovakia) Oldřich Menclík
- (Czechoslovakia) Václav Kokštejn
- (Romania) Nicolae Dumitrescu
- (Romania) Eugen Iordache
- (Romania) Carol Bartha
- (Romania) József Pecsovszky
