= Ljubiša Broćić =

Serbian footballer

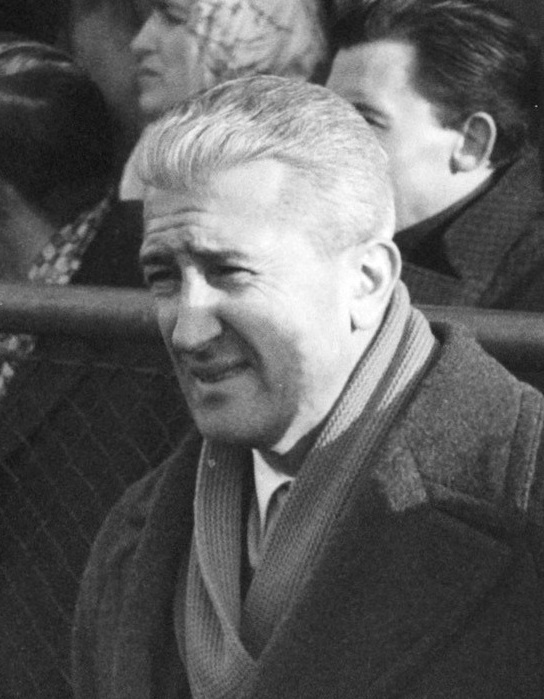
- Broćić coaching PSV Eindhoven in 1959

Personal information
- Date of birth: 3 October 1911
- Place of birth: Guča, Kingdom of Serbia
- Date of death: 16 August 1995 (aged 83)
- Place of death: Melbourne, Australia
- Position: Midfielder

Senior career*
| Years | Team | Apps | (Gls) |
| 1936–1940 | SK Jugoslavija | 46 | (2) |

Managerial career
- 1946: Albania
- 1947–1950: Metalac Beograd
- 1951: Red Star Belgrade
- 1952: Vojvodina
- 1953: Red Star Belgrade
- 1954–1955: Egypt
- 1955: Racing Beirut
- 1956: Lebanon
- 1956–1957: PSV
- 1957–1958: Juventus
- 1959–1960: PSV
- 1960–1961: Barcelona
- 1961: Tenerife
- 1962: Kuwait
- 1962–1964: New Zealand
- 1964–1966: South Melbourne Hellas
- 1968: South Melbourne Hellas
- 1969: New Zealand
- 1970: Kuwait
- 1971–1975: Bahrain
- 1976–1979: Al Nassr
- 1984–1985: Al Hilal
- 1985–1986: Al-Ahli
- 1986: Al-Raed
- * Club domestic league appearances and goals

Ljubiša Broćić (Serbian Cyrillic: Љубиша Броћић; 3 October 1911 – 16 August 1995) was a Yugoslav football player and manager.

== Career ==
Broćić was at the helm of some of the top European sides: PSV Eindhoven, Juventus, FC Barcelona, and Red Star Belgrade. He also was the manager of Al-Nassr in Saudi Arabia, OFK Beograd, Racing Beirut, as well as the Albania, Lebanon, Kuwait and Bahrain national teams. With Albania, Broćić won the Balkan Cup in 1946.

In 1953, the Yugoslavia national team was traveling in Brazil, where, according to senior officials in the then Yugoslav Football Association contacted the Chetnik emigrants, why was never allowed to return to Belgrade. The coach did not allow the communist authorities to interfere in his team selection during the World Cup in Brazil and tried to maintain his authority claiming he was defamed for allowing Serbian and Croatian immigrants in Brazil to simply take photos with the national team players.

He also coached Footscray JUST and South Melbourne Hellas in the Victorian State League during the 1960s, and also had stints with the New Zealand national team.

In 1985, Broćić managed Saudi Arabian side Al-Ahli. In 1986, he managed Saudi Arabian side Al-Raed, he was sacked on 27 September 1986.

== Honours ==
=== Manager ===
Red Star Belgrade

- Yugoslav First League: 1951, 1952–53
- Yugoslav Cup: 1950

Juventus

- Serie A: 1957–58

Albania

- Balkan Cup: 1946

Al Nassr

- King's Cup: 1976
- Saudi Federation Cup: 1976
