= Iosif Fabian =

Romanian footballer (1923–2008)

Personal information
- Full name: Josif Fabian II
- Date of birth: 10 August 1923
- Place of birth: Cluj, Kingdom of Romania
- Date of death: 6 July 2008 (aged 84)
- Place of death: Cascais, Portugal
- Height: 1.78 m (5 ft 10 in)
- Position: Striker

Youth career
- 1939–1943: Muncitorii Cluj

Senior career*
Years	Team	Apps	(Gls)
1943–1944	Szegedi AK	31	(19)
1945	Budapesti MÁVAG SK	1	(0)
1945	Ferar Cluj	7	(3)
1945–1947	Carmen București	24	(24)
1947–1948	Torino	15	(9)
1948–1949	Lucchese	28	(12)
1949–1951	Bari	63	(15)
1951–1953	Cannes	15	(8)
1952	→ Roubaix-Tourcoing (loan)	7	(1)
1953–1954	Sporting CP	6	(2)
1955–1956	Barreirense	13	(4)
Total		210	(97)

International career
1946	Romania	3	(1)

Managerial career
- 1955–1956: Barreirense (Player/coach)
- 1956–1957: FC Serpa (Player/coach)
- 1957–1958: Sporting Covilhã (Player/coach)
- 1961–1962: SC Caldas
- 1962–1963: Lusitano de Évora
- 1963–1964: SC Farense
- 1964–1965: Olhanense
- 1965–1966: Barreirense
- 1966–1967: SC Farense
- 1967–1970: Textáfrica
- 1970–1971: G.D. Chaves
- 1971–1972: Silves
- 1972–1973: Textáfrica
- 1976–1977: Sporting Covilhã
- * Club domestic league appearances and goals

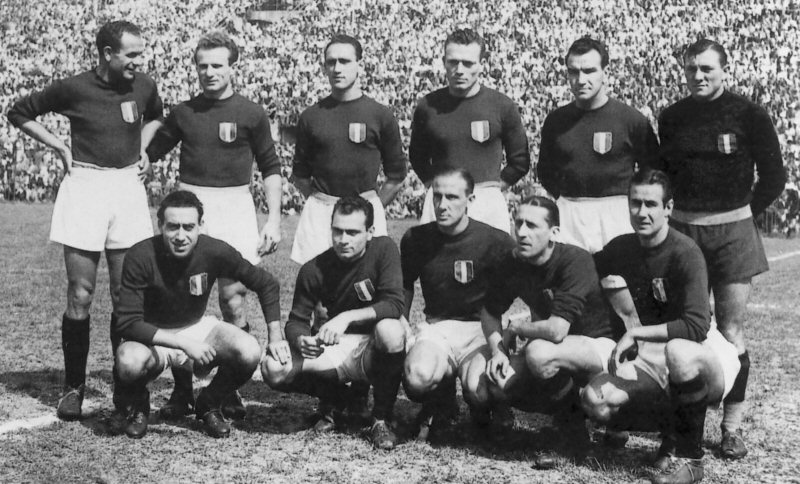
Torino 1947–48

Iosif Fabian (Portuguese: José Fabian; 10 August 1923 – 6 July 2008) was a Romanian football player and coach who played as a striker.

== Club career ==
Born in Cluj, Romania, Fabian started his youth career at Muncitorii Cluj. Then he went to play in the neighborhood country Hungary for a few years starting his senior career there. He returned to Romania, at the Ferar Cluj club for a short period before joining Carmen București. He made his Liga I debut on 25 August 1946 in a match against Jiul Petroşani winning 3–1 and scoring once. During that season he scored 13 goals in 13 matches, and puts his team on the second place in the 1946–47 league table. The same year he leaves Romania, and goes abroad to Italy and signs for AC Torino in the Serie A, where he met up with the legendary Valentino Mazzola, in his first season on the club Josef won the Serie A contributing with 9 goals in 15 appearances, and was the only foreigner on the team. Over the years spent in Italy, he also played for Lucchese and Bari.

In 1951 he left Italy, and went to France and signs for two seasons with AS Cannes, during the 1951–52 season he was loaned out to Roubaix-Tourcoing. During his time in France Spanish side Atlético Madrid put an eye on him and wanted to transfer him to Spain.

After his time in France, he went to Portugal in 1953, and signed for Sporting CP he made there only 6 appearances and scored two goals but won the Portuguese Liga in 1954. Fabian saw his name linked to several clubs and more in the various echelons of Portuguese football but choose instead Barreirense, he was a player-coach there.

After retiring, he started a long career coaching various teams in Portugal and Mozambique. His last training job was at Imortal de Albufeira in the 1983–84 season

== International career ==
Fabian made his debut for the national side led by coach Virgil Economu, on 8 October 1946, in a match against Bulgaria ended 2–2, his only goal for Romania was in a 2–1 victory over Yugoslavia in the Balkan Cup on 11 October 1946.

== Honours ==
Torino

- Serie A: 1947–48

Sporting CP

- Portuguese Liga: 1953–54
- Cup of Portugal: 1953–54
