= Traycho Petkov =

Bulgarian footballer

Personal information
- Date of birth: 4 September 1923
- Date of death: 1975 (aged 51–52)
- Position: Defender

International career
Years	Team	Apps	(Gls)
- Bulgaria

Traycho Petkov (Bulgarian: Трайчо Петков, 4 September 1923 – 1975) was a Bulgarian footballer. He competed in the men's tournament at the 1952 Summer Olympics.
