= Božidar Sandić =

Serbian footballer

Personal information
- Full name: Božidar Sandić
- Date of birth: 26 October 1922
- Place of birth: Kikinda, Kingdom of Serbs, Croats and Slovenes
- Date of death: 1 January 2008 (aged 85)
- Place of death: Kikinda, Serbia
- Position: Forward

Senior career*
Years	Team	Apps	(Gls)
1937–1940	ŽAK Kikinda		
1941	Sloga Kikinda		
1942–1943	Zvezda Novi Bečej		
1943–1944	SK 1913		
1944	Sloga Kikinda		
1944	SK Kikinda		
1945	Radnički Kikinda		
1946	SR Serbia		
1946–1949	Metalac Beograd	45	(12)
1950–1957	Banat Kikinda		
1957–1960	Proleter Zrenjanin		

International career
1946	Yugoslavia	1	(2)

Managerial career
- 1962: Odred Kikinda
- 1962–1974: ŽAK Kikinda
- OFK Kikinda
- * Club domestic league appearances and goals

Božidar Sandić (Serbian Cyrillic: Божидар Сандић; 26 October 1922 – 1 January 2008) was a Yugoslav footballer who played as a forward.

He was capped once for Yugoslavia, in an October 1946 Balkan Cup win over Bulgaria in which he scored both his country's goals.
