= Ion Lungu =

Romanian footballer

Personal information
- Date of birth: 2 August 1921
- Place of birth: Târgu Mureș, Romania
- Date of death: 1 February 1988 (aged 66)
- Position: Striker

Youth career
- 1936–1940: CFR Cluj
- 1940–1943: CFR Timișoara

Senior career*
Years	Team	Apps	(Gls)
1943–1951	Locomotiva București (Note: The Divizia A 1940–41 was the last season before World War II and the Divizia A 1946–47 was the first one after, so the appearances and goals scored during this period for Locomotiva București are not official with the exception of the 1945–46 regional championship.)	118	(54)
1951	Locomotiva Timișoara	11	(3)
1952–1954	Locomotiva București (Note: The statistics for the 1952 Divizia B season are unavailable.)	41	(1)
1955	Locomotiva Constanța	10	(0)
Total		180	(58)

International career
1949	Romania B	1	(0)
1949–1950	Romania	5	(3)
- * Club domestic league appearances and goals

Ion Lungu (2 August 1921 – 1 February 1988) was a Romanian footballer who played as a striker.

== International career ==
Ion Lungu played five friendly games for Romania, scoring a goal in his debut, a 3–2 away loss against Czechoslovakia. He also scored two goals in a 4–1 away victory against Albania.

== Honours ==
Locomotiva București

- Divizia B: 1952
