= Qamil Teliti =

Albanian footballer

Personal information
- Full name: Qamil Teliti
- Date of birth: 9 July 1922
- Place of birth: Kavajë, Albania
- Date of death: 7 December 1977 (aged 55)
- Place of death: Tirana, Albania
- Height: 1.80 m (5 ft 11 in)
- Position: Striker

Youth career
- Besa

Senior career*
Years	Team	Apps	(Gls)
1937–1941	Besa		
1947–1949	Partizani		
1949–1953	Dinamo		
- Tirana
- Apolonia

International career
1946–1952	Albania	13	(6)
- * Club domestic league appearances and goals

Qamil Teliti (9 July 1922 – 7 December 1977), nicknamed Tarzani, was an Albanian footballer known for being one of the most important players of the Albania team that won the Balkan Cup in 1946. Along with Loro Boriçi he was one of the artifices of the success of the team. He was posthumously honored for his services to Albanian football in 2018.

== Club career ==
Teliti started his senior career at hometown club Besa Kavajë during the mid-late 1930s. He was known for his powerful right foot and scoring from long distances. This earned him the reputation as the most feared striker in the country that soon attracted the attention of the national team. He was a successful player for Besa and went on to compete for all three of Tirana's professional clubs.

Qamil Teliti competed in over 30 international matches for Besa, Dinamo, Tirana, Partizani and Vllaznia.

== International career ==
He made his debut and scored the first ever goal for Albania in a friendly not recognised by FIFA against Montenegro, played in Shkodër on 22 September 1946. Albania won the match 5–0. Teliti also scored the final goal of the match in the '75th minute. On 13 October 1946 in the match against Romania during the Balkan Championship tournament, Teliti scored the only goal of the match in the '55th minute. It was a powerful long-distance shot that beat goalkeeper Lăzăreanu. Albania became Balkan Champion and Teliti's legacy was forever cemented in the hearts and minds of all football fans around the country.

He earned a total of 13 caps, scoring 6 goals. His final international was a December 1952 friendly match against Czechoslovakia.

International goals by date, venue, cap, opponent, score, result and competition
No.	Date	Venue	Cap	Opponent	Goals	Result	Competition
1	22 September 1946	Shkodër, Albania	1	(Socialist Republic of Montenegro) Montenegro		5–0 W	Friendly
2	7 October 1946	Tirana, Albania	2	Yugoslavia		2–3 L	1946 Balkan Cup
3	13 October 1946	Tirana, Albania	4	Romania		1–0 W	1946 Balkan Cup
4	23 October 1949	Bucharest, Romania	8	Romania		1–1 T	Friendly
5	29 November 1952	Tirana, Albania	12	Czechoslovakia		3–2 W	Friendly

== Honours ==
- Albanian Superliga: 4

1950, 1951, 1952, 1953

- Balkan Cup: 1

1946
