= Virgil Economu =

Romanian football manager

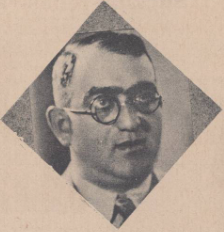

Personal information
- Date of birth: 21 November 1896
- Place of birth: Bucharest, Kingdom of Romania
- Date of death: 6 July 1978 (aged 81)

Managerial career
- Years: Team
- 1923–1927: Pepiniera Istrița / Vârtejul Buzău
- 1927–1928: Unirea Tricolor București
- 1928–1930: Gloria CFR Arad
- 1933–1934: Acvila Giurgiu
- 1939–1940: Romania
- 1941–1942: Romania
- 1946: Romania

Virgil Economu (21 November 1896 – 6 July 1978) was a Romanian rugby player, football manager, journalist and a writer.

== Early life ==
Economu was born on 21 November 1896 in Bucharest, Romania, of half-Jewish descent on his mother's side. He spent his high school years in Vienna, and graduated from the University of Agronomy at Montpellier, where he also played rugby for the local team.

== Career ==
In 1923, Economu started his football coaching career at Pepiniera Istrița, and then moved to Vârtejul Buzău. During the same year, he founded the first school of football referees in Romania. Between 1927 and 1928, he coached Unirea Tricolor București. Subsequently, he went to coach Gloria CFR Arad, guiding it to the 1929–30 Divizia A final which was lost with 3–0 to Juventus București. In the 1930s, Economu was the deputy minister of Agronomy in Romania and he also worked in the press as the director of the "Sportul Capitalei" newspaper, the head of the sports section for "Curentul", and a sports announcer. From 1933 to 1934, he coached Acvila Giurgiu.

In 1937, Economu was hired as technical director of Romania's national team, and in 1938 he founded the first coaching school in Romania. In 1939 he was named head coach of the national team. His first match was a 1–0 victory against Yugoslavia in the friendly 1939 King Carol's Cup, courtesy of a goal scored by Ștefan Dobay. In 1940, Romania had to play a friendly in Frankfurt against Germany but Economu did not receive an entrance visa because of his Jewish origin. Consequently, Romania's Football Federation president Gabriel Marinescu wrote a letter to Wilhelm Fabricius who was Adolf Hitler's minister from Bucharest, in which he asked him to give Economu an entrance visa, claiming he is of ethnic Romanian origin. Economu received the visa and the game ended with a 9–3 victory for Germany. He also suffered discrimination in Romania due to his heritage, being fired in October 1940 from his post as General Inspector at the Center for the Capitalization of Wheat. His second spell as Romania's coach began in July 1941, leading them in two friendlies, which were a 4–1 loss to Germany and a 3–2 win over Slovakia. Subsequently, in December 1941 his name disappeared from the army records, where he was listed as a lieutenant in reserve, a decision published in Romania's Official Gazette. In 1945, Economu was actively involved in the reorganization of the Romanian Football Federation and the establishment of the "Sportul Popular" newspaper. From 1946 until 1947 he was the Romanian Football Federation's president and appointed himself head coach of the national team, leading it during the 1946 Balkan Cup. There, Romania finished third, after earning a draw against Bulgaria, a win over Yugoslavia and a loss to Albania. In his three spells as Romania's coach, Economu accumulated a total of 14 games (4 victories, 3 draws, 7 losses).

From 1953 to 1957, he was technical director at CCA București. Between 1962 and 1966, he served as coordinating director at "23 August", which was the first center for children and juniors in Romania. From 1967 to 1968, Economu was Ilie Savu's counselor at Steaua București and between 1967 and 1974, he worked again for the Romanian Football Federation.

== Writing ==
Economu wrote a total of six volumes, all of which were about football:

- Fotbal – studiu documentar și critic (Football – documentary and critical study) (1935)
- Fotbal – contribuții la studiul unei metode unitare de joc, cu aplicații la echipa C.C.A. (Football – contributions to the study of a unitary method of play, with applications to the C.C.A. team) (1958)
- Fotbal – probleme de tactică în jocul modern (Football – tactical problems in the modern game) (1964)
- Sistemul de patru fundași (The four-defender system) (1965)
- Fotbalul modern simplificat și 400 de întrebari și raspunsuri (Simplified modern football and 400 questions and answers) (1972)
- Fotbal de la Mexico la Munchen (Football from Mexico to Munich) (1972)

== Death ==
Economu died on 6 July 1978 at the age of 81.

== Honours ==
=== Manager ===
Gloria CFR Arad

- Divizia A runner-up: 1929–30
