= 1947 Balkan Cup =

1947 Balkan and Central European Championship
Tournament details
- Dates: 25 May – 12 October 1947
- Teams: 5

Final positions
- Champions: Hungary (1st title)
- Runners-up: Yugoslavia
- Third place: Romania
- Fourth place: Bulgaria

Tournament statistics
- Matches played: 10
- Goals scored: 44 (4.4 per match)
- Top goal scorer: (Hungary) Ferenc Deák (5 goals)

The 1947 Balkan Cup, officially called the Balkan and Central European Championship, was played between May and October 1947 between Albania, Romania, Bulgaria, Yugoslavia and Hungary. It was Hungary's first participation in the tournament (which is why the term "and Central European" was added to the name). Hungary won every match that it played, and won the overall tournament.

== Final standings ==
Pos	Team	Pld	W	D	L	GF	GA	GR	Pts	Qualification
1	Hungary (C)	4	4	0	0	18	2	9.000	8	Winners
2	Yugoslavia	4	3	0	1	11	7	1.571	6	
3	Romania	4	2	0	2	8	8	1.000	4	
4	Bulgaria	4	1	0	3	5	14	0.357	2	
5	Albania	4	0	0	4	2	13	0.154	0	

Source: EU.football
(C) Champions

== Matches ==
25 May 1947

Albania	0–4	Romania
	Report	Farkaș 29', 69', 79'; Kovács 48'

Qemal Stafa Stadium, Tirana
Attendance: 20,000
Referee: Kamarás Árpád (Hungary)

15 June 1947

Bulgaria	2–0	Albania
Stankov 1', 20'	Report

Yunak Stadium, Sofia
Attendance: 30,000
Referee: Miljenko Podubsky (Yugoslavia)

22 June 1947

Romania	1–3	Yugoslavia
Farkaș 43'	Report	Bobek 38', 52'; Jezerkić 40'

Stadionul Giulești, Bucharest
Attendance: 25,000
Referee: Molnar Imre (Hungary)

28 June 1947

Yugoslavia	2–3	Hungary
Cimermančić 36'; Mihajlović 62'	Report	Gyula 34'; Puskás 57'; István 83'

JNA Stadium, Belgrade
Attendance: 30,000
Referee: Constantin Iliescu (Romania)

6 July 1947

Bulgaria	2–3	Romania
Stankov 47'; Yordanov 82'	Report	Băcuț 38'; Pecsovszky 59'; Marian 61'

Yunak Stadium, Sofia
Attendance: 25,000
Referee: Marijan Matančić (Yugoslavia)

17 August 1947

Hungary	9–0	Bulgaria
Deák 15', 34', 52', 79'; Zsolnai 34'; Nagymarosi 48'; Hidegkuti 47', 50', 86'	Report

Üllői út, Budapest
Attendance: 20,000
Referee: Constantin Iliescu (Romania)

20 August 1947

Hungary	3–0	Albania
Zsolnai 7'; Egresi 25'; Deák 53'	Report

Üllői út, Budapest
Attendance: 15,000
Referee: Dimitar Stoyanov (Bulgaria)

14 September 1947

Albania	2–4	Yugoslavia
Boriçi 12'; Parapani 64'	Report	Bobek 21'; Krnić 27'; Mitić 30'; Cimermančić 42'

Qemal Stafa Stadium, Tirana
Attendance: 20,000
Referee: Viktor Vrhovac (Yugoslavia)

12 October 1947

Romania	0–3	Hungary
	Report	Egresi 22'; Puskás 38', 83'

Stadionul Giulești, Bucharest
Attendance: 25,000
Referee: Miljenko Podubsky (Yugoslavia)

12 October 1947

Yugoslavia	2–1	Bulgaria
Mihajlović 18', 43'	Report	Stankov 12'

NK Zagreb Stadium, Zagreb
Attendance: 15,000
Referee: Varga Béla (Hungary)

== Winner ==
1947 Balkan Cup

Hungary
First title

== Statistics ==
=== Goalscorers ===
There were 44 goals scored in 10 matches, for an average of 4.4 goals per match.

5 goals

- (Hungary) Ferenc Deák

4 goals

- (Romania) Iuliu Farkaș
- (Bulgaria) Trendafil Stankov

3 goals

- (Hungary) Nándor Hidegkuti
- (Hungary) Ferenc Puskás
- (Socialist Federal Republic of Yugoslavia) Prvoslav Mihajlović
- (Socialist Federal Republic of Yugoslavia) Stjepan Bobek

2 goals

- (Hungary) Béla Egresi
- (Hungary) János Zsolnai
- (Socialist Federal Republic of Yugoslavia) Zvonimir Cimermančić

1 goal

- (Albania) Loro Boriçi
- (Albania) Aristidh Parapani
- (Bulgaria) Vuchko Yordanov
- (Hungary) Mihály Nagymarosi
- (Hungary) Mike István
- (Hungary) Szilágyi Gyula
- (Socialist Federal Republic of Yugoslavia) Jovan Jezerkić
- (Socialist Federal Republic of Yugoslavia) Jozo Krnić
- (Socialist Federal Republic of Yugoslavia) Rajko Mitić
- (Romania) Iosif Kovács
- (Romania) Gheorghe Băcuț
- (Romania) József Pecsovszky
- (Romania) Bazil Marian
