= Iuliu Farkaș =

Romanian footballer

Personal information
- Date of birth: 8 September 1923
- Place of birth: Petroșani, Romania
- Date of death: 9 May 1984 (aged 60)
- Height: 1.74 m (5 ft 9 in)
- Position: Forward

Youth career
- 1930–1940: Jiul Petroșani

Senior career*
| Years | Team | Apps | (Gls) |
| 1940–1941 | Jiul Petroșani | | |
| 1941–1943 | Ferencvárosi | 13 | (2) |
| 1943–1944 | Kolozsvári AC | 28 | (8) |
| 1944 | Rapid București | | |
| 1945–1947 | Carmen București (Note: The Divizia A 1940–41 was the last season before World War II and the Divizia A 1946–47 was the first one after, so the appearances and goals scored during this period for Carmen București are not official with the exception of the 1945–46 regional championship.) | 36 | (26) |
| 1947–1948 | Ciocanul București | 21 | (10) |
| 1948–1950 | Dinamo București | 24 | (15) |
| 1951–1955 | Jiul Petroșani | 82 | (36) |
| 1955–1956 | Minerul Lupeni | | |
| Total | | 216 | (109) |

International career^{‡}
| 1949 | Romania B | 1 | (1) |
| 1945–1949 | Romania | 9 | (6) |
- * Club domestic league appearances and goals as of 27 December 2019 ‡ National team caps and goals as of 27 December 2019

Iuliu Farkaș (also known as Gyula Farkas; 8 September 1923 – 9 May 1984) was a Romanian footballer who played as a forward.

== Club career ==
Farkaș was born on 8 September 1923 in Petroșani, Romania and began playing junior-level football in 1930 at local club Jiul. He started his senior career during the 1940–41 Divizia B season, helping Jiul get promoted to Divizia A, contributing with six goals scored.

In 1941, he joined Hungarian side, Ferencvárosi where he made his Nemzeti Bajnokság I debut on 6 September 1942 when coach Lajos Dimény used him the entire match in a 3–3 draw against Salgótarjáni BTC. His following game in the competition took place in February 1943, scoring a goal in a 8–2 win over Kolozsvári AC, and a week later, he netted once in a 4–0 victory against Törekvés SE. During his spell with The Greens, Farkaș won two Magyar Kupa. Afterwards he spent the 1943–44 season at Kolozsvári AC in the same league.

In 1944, Farkaș returned to Romania, playing for Rapid București for a short while. Then he joined Carmen București where on 25 August 1946 he made his Divizia A debut in a 3–1 away win against his former side, Jiul Petroșani in which he netted one goal. He scored a personal record of 14 goals until the end of the season. Afterwards, Farkaș went for one season at Ciocanul București who merged with Carmen in order to create Dinamo București. On 21 August 1948 he scored four goals in Dinamo's 4–1 win over his former side, Jiul. He would also score two doubles in two draws against rivals CCA București.

In 1951, Farkaș went back to hometown club, Jiul where he spent several successful seasons, earning the nickname "Picior de aur" (Golden Foot). The highlights were four goals netted in a 5–0 win over Știința Timișoara and a hat-trick in a 3–3 draw against his former club, Dinamo. His last Divizia A appearance took place on 13 March 1955 in a 0–0 draw against Locomotiva Constanța, totaling 151 matches with 75 goals in the competition. Farkaș ended his career in 1956 after playing one season in Divizia B for Minerul Lupeni.

== International career ==
Farkaș played nine matches and scored six goals for Romania, making his debut on 30 September 1945 when coach Coloman Braun-Bogdan sent him at half-time to replace Francisc Spielmann in a 7–2 friendly loss to Hungary. He played four games in the 1947 Balkan Cup, scoring a hat-trick in a 4–0 away victory against Albania and one goal in a 3–1 home loss to Yugoslavia. He played two games in the 1948 Balkan Cup, scoring two goals in a 3–2 victory against Bulgaria. Farkaș's last game for the national team was a friendly that ended in a 1–1 draw against Albania. He also played one game for Romania's B side.

=== International goals ===
Scores and results list Romania's goal tally first, score column indicates score after each Farkaș goal.

List of international goals scored by Iuliu Farkaș
| # | Date | Venue | Opponent | Score | Result | Competition |
|---|---|---|---|---|---|---|
| 1 | 25 May 1947 | Qemal Stafa Stadium, Tirana, Albania | Albania | 1–0 | 4–0 | 1947 Balkan Cup |
| 2 | 25 May 1947 | Qemal Stafa Stadium, Tirana, Albania | Albania | 3–0 | 4–0 | 1947 Balkan Cup |
| 3 | 25 May 1947 | Qemal Stafa Stadium, Tirana, Albania | Albania | 4–0 | 4–0 | 1947 Balkan Cup |
| 4 | 22 June 1947 | Stadionul Giulești, Bucharest, Romania | Yugoslavia | 1–2 | 1–3 | 1947 Balkan Cup |
| 5 | 20 June 1948 | Stadionul Giulești, Bucharest, Romania | Bulgaria | 1–2 | 3–2 | 1948 Balkan Cup |
| 6 | 20 June 1948 | Stadionul Giulești, Bucharest, Romania | Bulgaria | 2–2 | 3–2 | 1948 Balkan Cup |

== Death ==
Farkaș died on 9 May 1984 at age 60.

== Honours ==
Jiul Petroșani

- Divizia B: 1940–41

Ferencvárosi

- Magyar Kupa: 1941–42, 1942–43
