= Pal Mirashi =

Albanian footballer

Personal information
- Full name: Pal Mirashi
- Date of birth: 13 December 1925
- Place of birth: Shkodër, Albania
- Date of death: 13 October 2001 (aged 75)
- Position: Striker

Senior career*
Years	Team	Apps	(Gls)
1945–1951	Vllaznia		
1951–1954	Dinamo Tirana		

International career
1946–1950	Albania	9	(4)
- * Club domestic league appearances and goals

Pal Mirashi (13 December 1925 — 13 October 2001) was an Albanian football striker. He is known for being part of the 1946 Albania vs Yugoslavia football match, which was Albania's first official match. He earned 8 caps (plus one unofficial) with the national team, scoring 4 goals. He would end up scoring Albania's first-ever goal.

== Biography ==
Mirashi was born in Shkodër on 13 December 1925 into a poor family, where many of his siblings died as infants. His father's name was Mirash Mirashi and his mother's was Mrikë Mirashi, and besides Pal they 3 other boys, Ndue, Zef and Gjon, who would go on to become soldiers. His father Mirash was born and raised in the Dukagjin highlands but moved to the centre of Shkodër in 1920, where he worked as a handyman, and who is described as having been a simple, loving and generous man by his grandson Alsid Mirashi. Pal's oldest brother Ndue went to middle school in the southern city of Vlorë where he excelled in both football and basketball, but with the Italian invasion of Albania in 1939 he found his sporting opportunities limited due to his anti-fascist ideas. Once he returned to Shkodër he resumed playing football, as a centre back for Vllaznia Shkodër. He was an activist of the Balli Kombëtar (National Front) movement in the city and was executed by the Communist regime in 1945 for his involvement with the National Front. Prior to his execution alongside his friend Cef Meta, he showed courage by physically engaging in a fight with the guards who would very soon execute him.

As a 9-year-old child Pal along with his neighbourhood friends would watch football games being played inside the city of Shkodër as they had a desire to one day play themselves. He began playing football while still in primary school and along with his high school friends as a 15-year-old he created a team called Dodona. With Dodana he played against other local sides as well as the occupying Italian troops.

In December 1940 the Fascist Youth Federation organised a youth football competition in Shkodër, where the teams mainly consisted of high school and workers clubs. In the final Marashi was a member of the workers selection which lost 3–1 to the high school selection.

Towards the end of the Albanian Civil 1943–1944 Marashi was enlisted in the 6th brigade of the 6th division of the National Liberation Army (UNÇ), where he would travel through the Balkans fighting with the UNÇ alongside the Communists. Despite being at war and travelling, Marashi still managed to play football wherever he went, playing in friendly games for Albanian-speaking teams in cities such as Ohrid, Struga, Pristina and Ferizaj. With Ferizaj he played in a notable friendly game against the Yugoslav soldiers of the 44th division, which ended 2-2, with Marashi scoring both goals for the Albanians.

== International career ==
He made his debut for Albania in an August 1946 friendly match against Montenegro and earned a total of 9 caps, scoring 4 goals. His final international was a May 1950 friendly against Poland.

== Honours ==
- Albanian Superliga: 5

1946, 1950, 1951, 1952, 1953
