= Béla Egresi =

Hungarian footballer

Béla Egresi (born in Csepel on 11 May 1922 – died in Budapest on 10 June 1999) was a Hungarian football forward, who played for Kispest and Újpest FC, as well as representing 23 times the Hungary national football team between 1943 and 1953. He was a member of the Hungarian Golden Team.
