= List of Greece national football team hat-tricks =

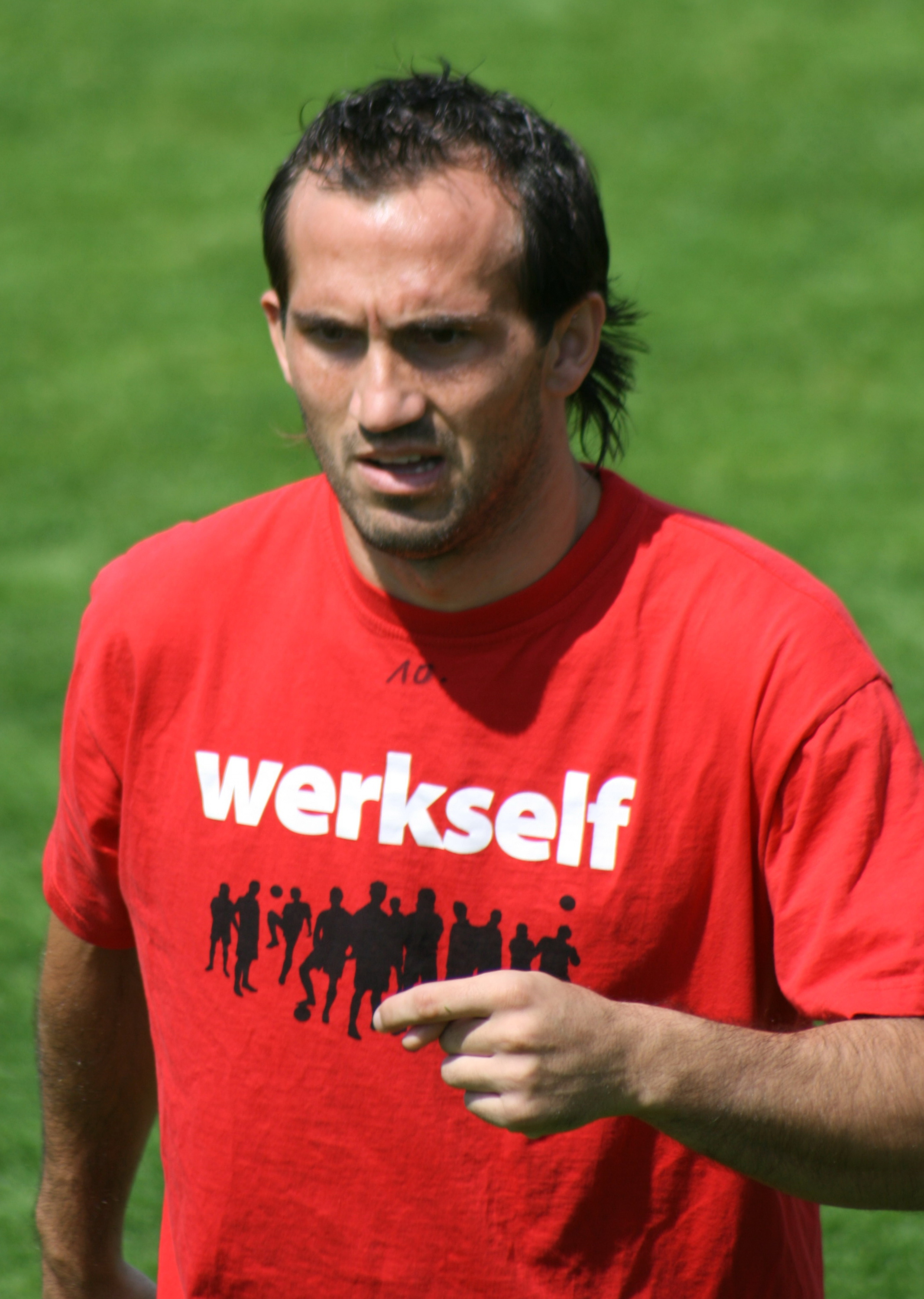
Fanis Gekas holds the record for the most hat-tricks scored by a Greek player with two

This page is a list of the hat-tricks scored for the Greece national football team. Since Greece's first international association football match in 1929, there have been 10 occasions when a Greek player has scored three or more goals (a hat-trick) in a game. The first hat-trick was scored by Antonis Tsolinas against Bulgaria on 7 December 1930, at the 1929-31 Balkan Cup. The record for the most goals scored in an international game by a Greek player is five, which has been achieved on just one occasion: by Dimitris Saravakos against Egypt in 1990, and he is closely followed by Antonis Tsolinas and Fanis Gekas who both managed to score 4 goals.

Fanis Gekas holds the record for the most hat-tricks scored by a Greek player with two, the first coming in a UEFA Euro 2008 qualifier against Malta and the second came in a 2010 World Cup qualifier in a 5–2 win over Latvia.

== Hat-tricks scored by Greece ==
No.	Player	Opponent	Goals	Score	Venue	Competition	Date	Ref(s)
1	Antonis Tsolinas	Bulgaria	4 – (4', 50', 51', 60')	6–1	Leoforos Alexandras Stadium, Athens	1929–31 Balkan Cup	7 December 1930	
2	Antonis Papantoniou	Syria	3 – (15', 17', 60')	8–0	Leoforos Alexandras Stadium, Athens	Friendly	25 November 1949	
3	Nikos Lekatsas	Syria	3 – (18', 23', 71')	4–0	Alexandria Stadium, Alexandria	1951 Mediterranean Games	14 October 1951	
4	Giorgos Darivas	Turkey	3 – (15', 44', 80')	3–0	Leoforos Alexandras Stadium, Athens	1950–53 Mediterranean Cup	29 February 1952	
5	Giorgos Sideris	Austria	3 – (28', 34'(pen.), 62')	4–1	Karaiskakis Stadium, Piraeus	UEFA Euro 1968 qualifying	4 October 1967	
6	Nikos Gioutsos	Israel	3 – (8', 23', 48')	3–3	Bloomfield Stadium, Tel Aviv	Friendly	12 March 1969	
7	Thomas Mavros	Finland	3 – (38', 44', 78'(pen.))	8–1	Leoforos Alexandras Stadium, Athens	UEFA Euro 1980 qualifying	11 October 1978	
8	Dimitris Saravakos	Egypt	5 – (47', 79', 80'(pen.), 88'(pen.), 90')	6–1	Olympic Stadium of Athens, Athens	Friendly	10 October 1990	
9	Fanis Gekas	Malta	3 – (33', 72', 74')	5–0	Olympic Stadium of Athens, Athens	UEFA Euro 2008 qualifying	17 November 2007	
10	Fanis Gekas	Latvia	4 – (4', 47'(pen.), 57', 90+2')	5–2	Olympic Stadium of Athens, Athens	2010 World Cup qualification	10 October 2009	

== Hat-tricks conceded by Greece ==
No.	Player	Opponent	Goals	Score	Venue	Competition	Date	Ref(s)
1	Rudolf Wetzer	Romania	5 – (8', 34', 75', 76', 80')	1–8	Stadionul Oficiul Național de Educație Fizică, Bucharest	1929–31 Balkan Cup	25 May 1930	
2	Aleksandar Tomašević	(Kingdom of Yugoslavia) Yugoslavia	3 – (38', 75', 83')	1–4	Stadion Beogradski, Belgrade	1929–31 Balkan Cup	15 March 1931	
3	Iuliu Bodola	Romania	3 – (13', 18', 84')	2–4	Leoforos Alexandras Stadium, Athens	1929–31 Balkan Cup	29 November 1931	
4	Slavko Kodrnja	(Kingdom of Yugoslavia) Yugoslavia	3 – (12', 20', 72')	3–5	Stadionul Oficiul Național de Educație Fizică, Bucharest	1933 Balkan Cup	3 June 1933	
5	Lyubomir Angelov	Bulgaria	3 – (26', 28', 63')	2–5	Yunak Stadium, Sofia	1935 Balkan Cup	16 June 1935	
6	Luigi Brugola	Italy B	3 – (35', 45', 80')	1–7	Stadio Vomero, Naples	1953–58 Mediterranean Cup	22 April 1956	
7	Harald Nielsen	Denmark	3 – (16', 47', 86')	2–7	Københavns Idrætspark, Copenhagen	Friendly	3 July 1960	
8	Henning Enoksen	Denmark	3 – (34', 51', 90')	2–7	Københavns Idrætspark, Copenhagen	Friendly	3 July 1960	
9	Anatoliy Banishevskiy	Soviet Union	3 – (25', 59', 82')	1–4	Karaiskakis Stadium, Piraeus	1966 FIFA World Cup qualification	3 October 1965	
10	Ion Dumitru	Romania	3 – (7', 32', 77')	1–6	Stadionul Steaua, Bucharest	Friendly	21 September 1977	
11	Vahid Halilhodžić	(Socialist Federal Republic of Yugoslavia) Yugoslavia	3 – (12', 20', 72')	1–4	Toše Proeski Arena, Skopje	1977–80 Balkan Cup	15 November 1978	
12	Vicky Peretz	Israel	3 – (29', 41', 80')	1–4	Ramat Gan Stadium, Ramat Gan	Friendly	14 February 1979	
13	Oleh Protasov	Soviet Union	3 – (2', 49', 57')	0–4	Olympic Stadium, Athens	Friendly	23 March 1988	
14	Gabriel Batistuta	Argentina	3 – (2', 44', 90'(pen.))	0–4	Foxboro Stadium, Foxborough	1994 FIFA World Cup	21 June 1994	
15	Tijjani Reijnders	Netherlands	3 – (12', 18', 33')	0–7	Johan Cruyff Arena, Amsterdam	2026–27 UEFA Nations League A	13 November 2026	

== See also ==
- Greece national football team results (1929–1959)
- Greece national football team results (1960–1979)
- Greece national football team results (1980–1999)
- Greece national football team results (2000–2019)
- Greece national football team results (2020–present)
