= Spain national football B team =

National football team

Spain B
- Association: Spanish Football Federation
- Most caps: Pepillo (9)
- Top scorer: Manuel Badenes (8)

First international
- Spain B 5–2 Portugal B (A Coruña, Spain; 20 March 1949)

Biggest win
- Spain B 7–1 Greece (Madrid, Spain; 13 March 1955)

Biggest defeat
- West Germany B 5–2 Spain B (Dortmund, West Germany; 14 June 1953); Spain B 2–5 West Germany B (Barcelona, Spain; 31 May 1956)

The Spain national football B team was a secondary football team run occasionally as support for the Spain national football team. They commonly played matches against 'B' teams from other football associations, from 1949 to 1981.

== Early history ==
Spain B's first game is considered by some to be the one on 29 May 1927 at the Metropolitan Stadium in Madrid, where they beat the Portugal A team 2-0, thanks to second-half goals from Francisco Moraleda and Manuel Valderrama. The team that started that day was Guillermo Eizaguirre, Miguel Garrobé, Emilio Perelló, Ramón Polo Pardo, Manuel Valderrama, Gonzalo, Domingo Carulla, Enrique Molina, Pedro Regueiro, Emili Sagi-Barba and Óscar, and the two substitutes that came after the break were Matías Aranzábal and Francisco Moraleda, with the latter scoring the opening goal. However, the Spain B team was only officially created 22 years later, in 1949, by the hands of the then national coach, Guillermo Eizaguirre, who had been the starting goalkeeper in the 1927 match. A Coruña was the city chosen to host this team's first-ever match against the Portuguese, and the Spanish B team won again, 5-2. And those who have played for the Spanish side that day include the likes of a young Estanislau Basora, Silvestre Igoa (scored twice) and Miguel Muñoz, all of whom future Spanish stars. The next game was played only four years later, in 1953, this time thanks to Ricardo Zamora (the then Spain coach), to give the possibility to test under-21 or less experienced players, in addition to those involved with the senior national team.

== Mediterranean Cup ==
Between 1953 and 1960 was when more games were held. A total of 17, divided between 8 friendlies and 9 Mediterranean Cup games. Spain B participated in the 1953-58 Mediterranean Cup, where they faced the A teams of Turkey, Egypt and Greece home and away, as well as the B teams of Italy and France, but Spain showed great character and won the tournament with 5 points to spare, finishing with 8 wins, 1 draw and 1 defeat, with their only loss in the tournament coming at the hands of Greece (0-2) in Athens on 13 March 1957, which was a huge upset as Spain had beat them 7-1 at home. The top goal scorer of the tournament was Manuel Badenes with 8 goals courtesy of two pokers, the first in a 7-1 win over Greece on 13 March 1955 and the other in a 5-1 win over Egypt on 27 November of the same year. These 8 goals also makes him the all-time top goal scorer of the Spain B team.

== 1982 World Cup ==
Preparing the squad for the 1982 World Cup in Spain, the then Spanish coach, José Santamaría and the then Spanish U-21 coach, Luis Suárez, put together a block of 7 Friendly tests throughout 1980 and 1981, and in this block, Javier Urruticoechea established himself as a goalkeeper, playing 5 of the 7 games. The squad of this B side was Javier Urruticoechea, Francisco García, Marcos Alonso, Juan José Rubio, Ricardo Gallego, Francisco Pineda, Antonio Maceda, Manuel Jiménez, Víctor Muñoz, Cundi, Periko Alonso, Pichi Alonso, Dani, Julio Alberto, Gerardo Miranda, Santillana and Juan José. The most recent fixture was a friendly against Poland B on 18 November 1981, which ended in a 2-0 with two goals from Pichi Alonso.

== Results ==
29 May 1927 Friendly (Note: In May 1927, Spain played a friendly against Portugal in Madrid on the same day as they played Italy in Rome. The squad for the Italy game was more experienced and considered to be stronger, while several players in the Portugal match made their debuts; consequently the Spain team is considered to have been equivalent to its B team (although they won their match while the A team lost theirs) and thus not a full international, although the match is included in some media articles relating to the rivalry and in some statistical tallies of caps for the players involved.)	Spain	2 – 0	Portugal	Estadio Metropolitano, Madrid
17:30 (UTC+1:00)	Moraleda 61'; Valderrama 81'	Report		Attendance: 30,000; Referee: (England) Thomas Crewe

20 March 1949 Friendly	Spain	5–2	Portugal	Riazor, A Coruña
	Ontoria 7'; Igoa 15', 60'; Bazán 35'; Escudero 43'	Report	Caiado 11'; Bentes 84'	Referee: Léon Boes (France)

6 May 1953 Friendly	Spain	2–0	Luxembourg	Mestalla, Valencia
18:00	Manchón 25'; Buqué 28'	Report		Referee: Raymond Vicenti (France)

14 June 1953 Friendly	West Germany	5–2	Spain	Rote Erde, Dortmund
	Pfaff 32', 44'; Schäfer 34', 54', 58'	Report	Ramoní 36', 39'	Referee: Karel van der Meer (Netherlands)

30 May 1954 1953-58 Mediterranean Cup	France	0–2	Spain	Saint Léon, Bayonne
		Report	Tejada 6'; Arieta 88'	Referee: José Vieira da Costa (Portugal)

13 March 1955 1953-58 Mediterranean Cup	Spain	7–1	Greece	Santiago Bernabéu, Madrid
	Badenes 7', 35', 51', 58'; Olmedo 33', 68'; Maguregui 82'	Report	Emmanouilidis 37'	Referee: Maurice Frédéric Guigue (France)

10 November 1955 1953-58 Mediterranean Cup	Spain	3–1	France	Santiago Bernabéu, Madrid
	Domingo 15'; Agustín 17'; Collar 28'	Report	Dalla Cieca 8'	Referee: Eduardo Gouveia (Portugal)

27 November 1955 1953-58 Mediterranean Cup	Spain	5–1	Egypt	Santiago Bernabéu, Madrid
	Tejada 43'; Badenes 47', 70', 73', 87'	Report	El-Hamouly 8'	Referee: Armando Marchetti (Italy)

31 May 1956 Friendly	Spain	2–5	West Germany	Les Corts, Barcelona
17:30	Bosch 56'; Villaverde 85'	Report	Biesinger 20'; Gerritzen 30'; Szymaniak 53'; Schönhöft 77'; Schröder 88'	Referee: Joaquim Campos (Portugal)

8 December 1956 1953-58 Mediterranean Cup	Italy	0–1	Spain	Amsicora, Cagliari
		Report	Tejada 61'	Referee: Sulhi Garan (Turkey)

8 March 1957 1953-58 Mediterranean Cup	Egypt	0–1	Spain	Cairo
		Report	Pepillo 10'	Referee: Giannis Daskalakis (Greece)

13 March 1957 1953-58 Mediterranean Cup	Greece	2–0	Spain	Leoforos Alexandras, Athens
	Yfantis 2'; Panakis 43'	Report		Referee: Mario Maurelli (Italy)

6 November 1957 1953-58 Mediterranean Cup	Turkey	0–0	Spain	Mithatpaşa, Istanbul
		Report		Referee: Jacob Schrieber (West Germany)

24 November 1957 Friendly	Luxembourg	1–4	Spain	Municipal, Luxembourg City
	Mond 39' (pen.)	Report	Pepillo 16'; Peiró 20'; Tejada 50', 75'	Referee: Daniel Mellet (Switzerland)

13 April 1958 Friendly	Portugal	0–0	Spain	Nacional, Oeiras
		Report		Referee: Jean-Louis Groppi (France)

5 July 1958 1953-58 Mediterranean Cup	Spain	2–0	Turkey	Atotxa, San Sebastián
	Peiró 40'; Pepillo 82'	Report		Referee: Marcel Lequesne (France)

16 October 1958 1953-58 Mediterranean Cup	Spain	3–1	Italy	La Romareda, Zaragoza
	Peiró 25', 49', 50'	Report	Stacchini 59'	Referee: Jean-Louis Groppi (France)

15 May 1960 Friendly	Morocco	3–3	Spain	Honneur, Casablanca
	Chicha 45' (pen.); Baba 71'; Abdallah 74'	Report	Ruiz Sosa 16'; Ribelles 56'; Paredes 58'	Referee: Francisco Guerra (Portugal)

12 October 1960 Friendly	Spain	4–3	Morocco	Los Cármenes, Granada
16:30	Mateos 15', 23', 29'; Pepillo 17'	Report	Akesbi 35', 80'; El Filali 39'	Referee: Abel Campos (Portugal)

2 April 1961 Friendly	France	0–2	Spain	Municipal, Grenoble
		Report	Aguirre 14'; Marcelino 68'	Referee: Albert Guinard (Switzerland)

10 December 1961 Friendly	Spain	3–2	France	La Romareda, Zaragoza
	Adelardo 7'; Bueno 11' (pen.); Marcelino 53'	Report	Lafranceschina 54'; Rustichelli 85'	Referee: Abel da Costa (Portugal)

15 November 1964 Friendly	Spain	3–0	Portugal	El Arcángel, Córdoba
	José María 26' (pen.), 80' (pen.); Arieta 85'	Report		Referee: Andries van Leeuwen (Netherlands)

24 September 1980 Friendly	Spain	2–2	Hungary	Nou Estadi, Valencia
	Rubio 48' (pen.), 63' (pen.)	Report	Nagy 35'; Soos 44'	Referee: Paolo Casarin (Italy)

15 October 1980 Friendly	Spain	0–0	East Germany	Lluís Sitjar, Palma
		Report		Referee: Daniel Lambert (France)

12 November 1980 Friendly	Poland	0–0	Spain	Stali Mielec, Mielec
		Report		Referee: Manfred Roßner (East Germany)

18 February 1981 Friendly	France	0–0	Spain	Municipal, Toulouse
		Report		Referee: Enzo Barbaresco (Italy)

25 March 1981 Friendly	Spain	3–2	England	Los Cármenes, Granada
	Alonso 20'; Rubio 37'; Santillana 48'	Report	Statham 66'; Martin 76'	Referee: Hendrik van Ettekoven (Netherlands)

15 April 1981 Friendly	Hungary	1–3	Spain	Gyöngyös
	Borostyan 35'	Report	Dani 14'; Morán 23', 50'	Referee: Josef Marko (Czechoslovakia)

18 November 1981 Friendly	Spain	2–0	Poland	La Romareda, Zaragoza
	Alonso 27', 88' (pen.)	Report		Referee: Franz Gächter (Switzerland)

== Spain national football B team head to head ==
Key
Positive balance (more Wins)
Neutral balance (Wins = Losses)
Negative balance (more Losses)

Nationality	From	To	P	W	D	L	Win % (Note: A draw counts as a ½ win)	GF	GA	GD
France	1954	1981	5	4	1	0	90%	10	3	+7
Portugal	1949	1964	3	2	1	0	83.33%	8	2	+6
Luxembourg	1953	1957	2	2	0	0	100%	6	1	+5
Egypt	1955	1957	2	2	0	0	100%	6	1	+5
Italy	1956	1958	2	2	0	0	100%	4	1	+3
Hungary	1980	1981	2	1	1	0	75%	5	3	+2
Turkey	1957	1959	2	1	1	0	75%	2	0	+2
Poland	1980	1981	2	1	1	0	75%	2	0	+2
Morocco	1960	1960	2	1	1	0	75%	7	6	+1
Greece	1955	1957	2	1	0	1	50%	7	3	+4
West Germany	1953	1956	2	0	0	2	0%	4	10	–6
England	1981	1981	1	1	0	0	100%	3	2	+1
East Germany	1980	1980	1	0	1	0	50%	0	0	0
Total			28	18	7	3	76.79%	64	32	+32

== Player records ==
=== Top appearances ===
Rank	Player	Club(s)	Year(s)	Caps
1	Pepillo	Sevilla, Real Madrid	1955–1960	9
2	Enrique Collar	Atlético Madrid	1955–1959	7
2	Manuel Mestre	Valencia	1957–1960	7
4	Justo Tejada	Barcelona	1954–1960	6
4	Ferran Olivella	Barcelona	1956–1958	6
4	Francisco García	Real Madrid	1980–1981	6
4	Manuel Jiménez	Sporting Gijón	1980–1981	6
8	Campanal	Sevilla	1953–1957	5
8	Antonio Argilés	Espanyol	1953–1956	5
8	Joaquín Peiró	Atlético Madrid	1956–1959	5
8	José Vicente	Espanyol	1957–1960	5
8	Juan José Rubio	Atlético Madrid	1980–1981	5
8	Javier Urruticoechea	Espanyol	1980–1981	5

Note: Club(s) represents all the clubs that players played in at the time they did it too in the Bs.

=== Top goalscorers ===
Rank	Player	Club(s)	Year(s)	Goals
1	Manuel Badenes	Valencia	1955	8
2	Justo Tejada	Barcelona	1954–1960	5
2	Joaquín Peiró	Atlético Madrid	1956–1959	5
4	Pepillo	Sevilla, Real Madrid	1955–1960	4
5	Enrique Mateos	Real Madrid	1957–1960	3
5	Juan José Rubio	Atlético Madrid	1980–1981	3
7	Silvestre Igoa	Valencia	1949	2
7	Ramoní	Sevilla	1953	2
7	Pablo Olmedo	Celta Vigo	1955	2
7	Marcelino Martínez	Zaragoza	1961	2
7	José María García	Oviedo	1964	2
7	Pichi Alonso	Zaragoza	1981	2
7	Enrique Morán	Betis	1981	2

Note: Club(s) represents all the clubs that players played in at the time they did it too in the Bs.

== Honours ==
Mediterranean Cup Champion: 1953-58
