= Pablo Olmedo (footballer) =

Spanish footballer and manager

Personal information
- Full name: Pablo Olmedo Garmendia
- Date of birth: 13 April 1929
- Place of birth: Madrid, Spain
- Date of death: 15 April 1980 (aged 51)
- Place of death: Vigo, Spain
- Position: Midfielder

Senior career*
Years	Team	Apps	(Gls)
1945–1946	Ferroviaria		
1946–1948	Logroñés		
1948–1951	Real Madrid		
1949–1950	→ Atlético Madrid (on loan)		
1951–1952	Celta de Vigo		
1952–1953	Real Madrid		
1953–1959	Celta de Vigo		

International career
1955	Spain B	1	(2)

Managerial career
- 1964–1965: Lugo
- 1969–1970: Plus Ultra
- * Club domestic league appearances and goals

Pablo Olmedo Garmendia (13 April 1929 – 15 April 1980) was a Spanish footballer who played as a midfielder for Real Madrid, Atlético Madrid, and Celta de Vigo in 1950s. He was also a member of the Spanish B squad that won the 1953–58 Mediterranean Cup.

After retiring, Olmedo became a coach.

== Biography ==
Born on 13 April 1929 in Madrid, Olmedo began his career at Ferroviaria in 1945, aged 16, but after only one season there, he joined Logroñés, then in the Tercera División. Two years later, he was signed by his hometown club Real Madrid, and his five-year stay at Real, from 1948 to 1953, was interrupted twice, first with a loan to Atlético Madrid in 1949–50, in which he won the league, and then with a season at Celta de Vigo in 1951–52. In total, he played 108 official matches for Madrid, and only won one title, the 1952 Small Club World Cup.

In 1953, Olmedo signed for Celta de Vigo again, and this time he remained there for eight years, until 1960; Vigo was relegated to the Segunda División in 1959, and after failing to return to the top division, he retired from football, at the age of 31. In total, he scored 72 goals in 240 La Liga matches. On 13 March 1955, Olmedo earned his first (and last) international cap for Spain B, in a match at the 1953–58 Mediterranean Cup, scoring twice to help his side to a 7–1 win over Greece; Spain eventually won the tournament.

After retiring, he became a coach, taking charge of the likes of CD Lugo in 1964–65, and Plus Ultra in 1969–70.

Olmedo died in Vigo on 15 April 1980, at the age of 51.

== Honours ==
=== Club ===
Real Madrid

- Small Club World Cup:
  - Champions (1): 1952
- Atlético Madrid:
  - Champions (1): 1949–50

=== International ===
Spain B

- Mediterranean Cup: 1953-58

== See also ==
- List of Real Madrid CF players
