= Pablo Olmedo =

Pablo Olmedo may refer to:

- Pablo Olmedo (athlete) (born 1975), Mexican middle- and long-distance runner
- Pablo Olmedo (footballer) (1929–1980), Spanish footballer and coach
