= 1953–58 Mediterranean Cup =

Tournament details
- Dates: 18 October 1953 – 16 October 1958
- Teams: 6 (from 2 confederations)

Final positions
- Champions: Spain B (1st title)
- Runners-up: France B
- Third place: Italy B
- Fourth place: Turkey

Tournament statistics
- Matches played: 28
- Goals scored: 65 (2.32 per match)
- Top scorer(s): (Spain) Manuel Badenes (8 goals)

The 1953–58 Mediterranean Cup was the third and last championship of the Mediterranean Cup, which is a football competition contested by men's national teams and national B teams of the states bordering the Mediterranean Sea. The tournament was played on the road and spanned six years, and it was played in a round-robin system in which the six teams involved played two matches against the other. Italy, France and Spain played with their B teams and the later became the champion of the organization in which Egypt, Turkey and Greece participated with their A teams.

The matches that were supposed to be played between the teams of Turkey and Greece were not played due to the tension between the two countries, and Turkey played the last three matches with the B team.

== Results ==
=== Group ===
Team	Pld	W	D	L	GF	GA	GD	Pts	Qualification
Spain B	10	8	1	1	24	6	+18	17	Winners
France B	10	4	4	2	14	8	+6	12	
Italy B	10	3	3	4	12	9	+3	9	
Turkey	8	2	3	3	7	7	0	7	
Greece	8	1	4	3	6	17	−11	6	
Egypt	10	1	3	6	5	21	−16	5	

Source: EU-Football
18 October 1953

Greece	0–0	France B
	Report

Prince Farouk Stadium, Cairo
Attendance: 25,000
Referee: Riccardo Pieri (Italy)

22 October 1953

Egypt	0–0	France B
	[Report]

Prince Farouk Stadium, Cairo

11 December 1953

Turkey	0–1	Italy B
	Report	Pesaola 10'

Mithatpaşa Stadium, Istanbul
Attendance: 22,693
Referee: Albert Dusch (West Germany)

11 April 1954

Italy B	0–0	France B

Roma

30 May 1954

France B	0–2	Spain B
	Report	Tejada 6'; Arieta 88'

Saint Léon, Bayonne
Referee: José Vieira da Costa (Portugal)

7 November 1954

Greece	1–1	Egypt
Kouiroukidis 50'	Report	El-Dhizui 5'

Leoforos Alexandras Stadium, Athens
Attendance: 25,000
Referee: Vasa Stefanović (Yugoslavia)

21 January 1955

Egypt	1–1	Greece
El-Dhizui 29'	Report	Panakis 39'

Prince Farouk Stadium, Cairo
Attendance: 25,000
Referee: Édouard Harzic (France)

13 March 1955

Spain B	7–1	Greece
Badenes 7', 35', 51', 58'; Olmedo 33', 68'; Maguregui 82'	Report	Emmanouilidis 37'

Santiago Bernabéu Stadium, Madrid
Attendance: 120,000
Referee: Maurice Frédéric Guigue (France)

17 March 1955

France B	1–0	Greece
Rosidis 52' (o.g.)	Report

Stade Vélodrome, Marseille
Attendance: 15,000
Referee: Riccardo Pieri (Italy)

3 April 1955

Turkey	0–0	France B
	Report

Mithatpaşa Stadium, Istanbul
Attendance: 24,237
Referee: Cesare Jonni (Italy)

15 April 1955

France B	7–1	Egypt
??'	[Report]	El-Dhizui ?'

Stade du Ray, Nice

29 May 1955

Greece	0–0	Italy B
	Report

Leoforos Alexandras Stadium, Athens
Attendance: 25,000
Referee: Borče Nedelkovski (Yugoslavia)

26 June 1955

Italy B	1–1	Turkey
Bettini 18'	Report	Küçükandonyadis 78'

Stadio Giuseppe Grezar, Trieste
Attendance: 37,000
Referee: Armand Merlotti (Switzerland)

11 November 1955

Spain B	3–1	France B
Domingo 15'; Agustín 17'; Collar 28'	Report	Dalla Cieca 8'

Santiago Bernabéu, Madrid
Referee: Eduardo Gouveia (Portugal)

27 November 1955

Spain B	5–1	Egypt
Tejada 43'; Badenes 47', 70', 73', 87'	Report	El-Hamouly 8'

Santiago Bernabéu, Madrid
Referee: Armando Marchetti (Italy)

16 December 1955

Egypt	0–1	Italy B
	[Report]	??'

Prince Farouk Stadium, Cairo

25 December 1955

France B	3–1	Turkey
Curyl 37', 85'; Schultz 76'	Report	Oktay 65'

Parc des Princes, Paris
Attendance: 20,000
Referee: Manuel Asensi Martín (Spain)

15 February 1956

France B	2–1	Italy B
?'	[Report]	?'

Stade Vélodrome, Marseille

22 April 1956

Italy B	7–1	Greece
Muccinelli 7', 10'; Pozzan 9'; Brugola 35', 45', 80'; Grazena 62'	Report	Panakis 49'

Stadio Vomero, Naples
Attendance: 30,000
Referee: Louis Fauquemberghe (France)

8 December 1956

Italy B	0–1	Spain B
	Report	Tejada 61'

Stadio Amsicora, Cagliari
Referee: Sulhi Garan (Turkey)

8 March 1957

Egypt	0–1	Spain B
	Report	Pepillo 10'

Prince Farouk Stadium, Cairo
Referee: Giannis Daskalakis (Greece)

13 March 1957

Greece	2–0	Spain B
Yfantis 2'; Panakis 43'	Report

Leoforos Alexandras Stadium, Athens
Attendance: 25,000
Referee: Mario Maurelli (Italy)

5 April 1957

Egypt	0–4	Turkey
	Report	Küçükandonyadis 3', 41' (pen.), 65'; Kiremitçi 72'

Al Zamalek Stadium, Cairo
Attendance: 20,000
Referee: Giulio Campanati (Italy)

12 May 1957

Italy B	0–1	Egypt
	[Report]	Fattah 5'

Stadio Adriatico, Pescara

20 May 1957

Turkey B	1–0	Egypt
Erdoğan Gökçen 10'	Report

Mithatpaşa Stadium, Istanbul
Attendance: 25,421
Referee: Armando Marchetti (Italy)

6 November 1957

Turkey B	0–0	Spain B
	Report; Report

Mithatpaşa Stadium, Istanbul
Attendance: 23,578
Referee: Jacob Schrieber (West Germany)

6 July 1958

Spain B	2–0	Turkey B
Peiró 40'; Pepillo 82'	Report

Atotxa, San Sebastián
Referee: Marcel Lequesne (France)

16 October 1958

Spain B	3–1	Italy B
Peiró 25', 49', 50'	Report	Stacchini 59'

La Romareda, Zaragoza
Referee: Jean-Louis Groppi (France)

1953-58 Mediterranean Cup

Spain B
First title

== Top Scorers ==
Player	Team	Goals
Manuel Badenes	Spain B	8
Joaquín Peiró	Spain B	4
Lefter Küçükandonyadis	Turkey	4
Vangelis Panakis	Greece	3
Luigi Brugola	Italy B	3
Justo Tejada	Spain B	3
El-Sayed El-Dhizui	Egypt	3
Ermes Muccinelli	Italy B	2
Pablo Olmedo	Spain B	2
Pepillo	Spain B	2
