= 1950–53 Mediterranean Cup =

1950-53 Mediterranean Cup
Tournament details
- Dates: 18 October 1953 - 16 October 1958
- Teams: 4 (from 2 confederations)

Final positions
- Champions: Italy B (1st title)
- Runners-up: Greece
- Third place: Egypt
- Fourth place: Turkey

Tournament statistics
- Matches played: 12
- Goals scored: 29 (2.42 per match)
- Top scorer(s): (Greece) Georgios Darivas (Egypt) El-Sayed El-Dhizui (4 goals)

The 1950–53 Mediterranean Cup or 1950-53 Eastern Mediterranean Cup was the second tournament of the Mediterranean Cup, which is a football competition contested by men's national teams and national B teams of the states bordering the Mediterranean Sea. The tournament was played on the road and spanned three years, and it was played in a round-robin system in which the four teams involved played two matches against each other. Egypt, Turkey and Greece participated with their A teams, while Italy disputed this tournament with their B team, and they won with 8 points while Greece finished in second with 7 points.

== Results ==
=== Group ===
Team	Pts	Pld	W	D	L	GF	GA	GD
Italy B	8	6	3	2	1	10	4	+6
Greece	7	6	3	1	2	5	6	-1
Egypt	6	6	3	0	3	10	10	0
Turkey	3	6	1	1	4	4	9	-5

17 February 1950

Egypt	2–0	Greece
Toto 36', 87'	Report

Prince Farouk Stadium, Cairo
Attendance: 12,000
Referee: Generoso Dattilo (Italy)

28 October 1950

Turkey	3–1	Egypt
Esel 3', 25'; Küçükandonyadis 19'	[Report]	El-Dhizui 84'

Ankara 19 Mayıs Stadium, Ankara
Attendance: 19,000
Referee: Giorgio Bernardi (Italy)

8 December 1950

Egypt	3–0	Turkey
Khattab ??'; Saleh ??'; El-Dhizui ??'	[Report]

Prince Farouk Stadium, Cairo

8 April 1951

Italy B	3–0	Greece
Armano ??'; Ghiandi ??'; Galli ??'	Report

La Favorita, Palermo
Attendance: 8,000
Referee: Ismail Kassib (Egypt)

6 May 1951

Turkey	0–0	Italy B
	Report

Dolmabahçe Stadium, Istanbul
Referee: Paul von Wartburg (Switzerland)

11 November 1951

Egypt	3–0	Italy B
El-Hamouly ??'; El-Dhizui ??'	[Report]

Prince Farouk Stadium, Cairo

25 November 1951

Greece	1–0	Egypt
Darivas 16'	Report

Leoforos Alexandras Stadium, Athens
Attendance: 16,000
Referee: Sulhi Garan (Turkey)

24 February 1952

Italy B	1–0	Turkey
Broccini 77'	Report

Stadio Arturo Collana, Naples
Attendance: 16,000
Referee: Kosto Cicis (Greece)

29 February 1952

Greece	3–1	Turkey
Darivas 15', 44', 80'	Report	Sargın 38'

Leoforos Alexandras Stadium, Athens
Attendance: 20,000
Referee: Ferruccio Bellè (Italy)

16 May 1952

Turkey	0–1	Greece
	Report	Papageorgiou 9'

Mithatpaşa Stadyumu, Istanbul
Attendance: 20,000
Referee: Guido Agnolin (Italy)

26 October 1952

Italy B	6–1	Egypt
Bacci ??', ??'; Cervellati ??'; Galli ??', ??'; Frignani ??'	[Report]	El-Far ??'

Stadio San Nicola, Bari
Attendance: 16,000
Referee: Sulhi Garan (Turkey)

26 April 1953

Greece	0–0	Italy B
	Report

Leoforos Alexandras Stadium, Athens
Attendance: 22,000
Referee: Ernst Dörflinger (Switzerland)

=== Top Scorers ===
Player	Team	Goals
Georgios Darivas	Greece	4
El-Sayed El-Dhizui	Egypt	4
Carlo Galli	Italy B	3
