= Miguel Garrobé =

Spanish footballer and coach (1904–1954)

Personal information
- Full name: Miguel Garrobé Fargas
- Birth name: Miquel Garrobé i Fargas
- Date of birth: 10 June 1904
- Place of birth: Barcelona, Spain
- Date of death: 1954 (aged 49-50)
- Position: Defender

Senior career*
Years	Team	Apps	(Gls)
1921–1923	Júpiter		
1923–1924	Europa		
1924–1928	Valencia		
1928–1929	Extremeño		
1929–1930	Gimnástica de Torrelavega		

International career
1923–1924	Catalonia	2	(0)
1927	Spain B	1	(0)

Managerial career
- 1948–1949: Badajoz
- * Club domestic league appearances and goals

Miguel Garrobé Fargas (10 June 1904 – 1954) was a Spanish footballer who played as a defender for Valencia and the Spanish national B team in the late 1920s.

== Club career ==
Born in the Catalonian town of Barcelona on 10 June 1904, Garrobé began his football career at his hometown club Júpiter in 1921, with whom he played for two years, until 1923, when he joined Europa, where he quickly stood out as a great defender who possessed a good head game and a defensive anticipation ability that was ahead of his time.

In 1924, Valencia signed Garrobé, along with Benito Roca and Francisco Reyes, who thus became the club's first professional Catalan footballers. At Mestalla, he formed a great defensive partnership with Reyes, a former teammate at Júpiter, which played a crucial role in helping Valencia win a three-peat of Valencia Championships between 1925 and 1927. In 1928, however, he began to decline, being often outpaced by his opponents, so he was released at the end of the season. Due to his ease at carrying the ball and subsequent offensive ability, he was sometimes fielded as a left winger in some friendlies on a trial basis.

After leaving Valencia, Garrobé signed for Extremeño, where he worked as a player-coach. In 1929, he joined Gimnástica de Torrelavega, where he retired in 1930, aged only 26.

== International career ==
As a Júpiter player, Garrobé was eligible to play for the Catalan national team; together with FC Barcelona's Emili Sagi-Barba, Josep Samitier and Ricardo Zamora, he was part of the Catalan side that participated in the 1923–24 Prince of Asturias Cup, an inter-regional competition organized by the RFEF, starting in the quarter-finals against Gipuzkoa (2–1), and in the semifinals against Biscay (1–0), both at Les Corts, but then missing the final, which was won by Barça.

On 29 May 1927, Garrobé earned his first (and only) international cap for Spain B, in a friendly against Portugal's A side held at the Metropolitano, helping his side to a 2–0 win.

== Later life and death ==
Garrobé briefly worked as a Manager, guiding Badajoz in the 1948–49 season. He died in 1954, at the age of either 49 or 50.

== Honours ==
=== Club ===
Valencia CF

- Valencia Championship:
  - Champions (3) 1925, 1926, 1927

=== International ===
Catalonia

- Prince of Asturias Cup:
  - Champion (1): 1923–24
