= Manuel Badenes =

Spanish footballer

Personal information
- Full name: Manuel Badenes Calduch
- Date of birth: 31 October 1928
- Place of birth: Castellón, Spain
- Date of death: 26 November 2007 (aged 79)
- Place of death: Valencia, Spain
- Height: 1.80 m (5 ft 11 in)
- Position: Striker

Youth career
- Jari Jauja
- Peña Ribalta
- 1944–1946: Castellón

Senior career*
Years	Team	Apps	(Gls)
1946–1947	Castellón	11	(4)
1947–1950	Barcelona	14	(6)
1949–1950	→ Zaragoza (loan)	24	(23)
1950–1956	Valencia	97	(90)
1956–1958	Valladolid	59	(35)
1958–1960	Sporting Gijón	21	(4)
1960–1961	Castellón	24	(11)
1961–1962	Oliva		
Total		226	(173)

International career
1955	Spain B	2	(8)
- * Club domestic league appearances and goals

Manuel Badenes Calduch (31 October 1928 – 26 November 2007) was a Spanish footballer, who played as a forward for clubs such as FC Barcelona and Valencia CF.

== Club career ==
Badenes started his career at CD Castellón. His first season at the club saw him score four goals in ten games which resulted in a move to Barcelona. He spent two season at the club, winning two La Liga titles before moving to Valencia. He scored 90 goals in 97 games at Valencia before moving to Real Valladolid, where he won the Pichichi trophy awarded to the top scorer in La Liga in 1958.

== International career ==
Badenes is the all-time top goal scorer of Spain B with 8 goals, and remarkably, he managed to achieve this feat having only two appearances for the team (a ratio of four goals per game), both at the 1953–58 Mediterranean Cup, netting four past Greece and four again against Egypt, to be crowned the tournament's top goal scorer. However, despite his prolificness for the B team, he never managed to reach the main team.

== Club statistics ==
Club performance			League	
Season	Club	League	Apps	Goals
Spain			League	
1946–47	Castellón	La Liga	11	4
Total			11	4
1947–48	FC Barcelona	La Liga	13	6
1948–49	FC Barcelona	La Liga	1	0
Total			14	6
1950–51	Valencia CF	La Liga	21	20
1951–52	Valencia CF	La Liga	24	18
1952–53	Valencia CF	La Liga	19	16
1953–54	Valencia CF	La Liga	6	4
1954–55	Valencia CF	La Liga	16	22
1955–56	Valencia CF	La Liga	11	10
Total			97	90
1956–57	Valladolid	La Liga	30	16
1957–58	Valladolid	La Liga	29	19
Total			59	35
1958–59	Sporting de Gijón	La Liga	21	4
Total			21	4
Total	Spain		202	139

== International goals ==
Spain B score listed first, score column indicates score after each Badenes goal.

List of international goals scored by Manuel Badenes
No.	Date	Venue	Opponent	Score	Result	Competition
1	13 March 1955	Santiago Bernabéu Stadium, Madrid, Spain	Greece	1–0	7–1	1953–58 Mediterranean Cup
2	13 March 1955	Santiago Bernabéu Stadium, Madrid, Spain	Greece	3–0	7–1	1953–58 Mediterranean Cup
3	13 March 1955	Santiago Bernabéu Stadium, Madrid, Spain	Greece	4–1	7–1	1953–58 Mediterranean Cup
4	13 March 1955	Santiago Bernabéu Stadium, Madrid, Spain	Greece	5–1	7–1	1953–58 Mediterranean Cup
5	27 November 1955	Santiago Bernabéu Stadium, Madrid, Spain	Egypt	2–1	5–1	1953–58 Mediterranean Cup
6	27 November 1955	Santiago Bernabéu Stadium, Madrid, Spain	Egypt	3–1	5–1	1953–58 Mediterranean Cup
7	27 November 1955	Santiago Bernabéu Stadium, Madrid, Spain	Egypt	4–1	5–1	1953–58 Mediterranean Cup
8	27 November 1955	Santiago Bernabéu Stadium, Madrid, Spain	Egypt	5–1	5–1	1953–58 Mediterranean Cup

== Honours ==
=== Club ===
FC Barcelona

- Spanish League: 1947–48, 1948–49
- Latin Cup: 1949
- Copa Eva Duarte: 1948

Valencia CF

- Spanish Cup: 1953–54

=== International ===
Spain B

- Mediterranean Cup: 1953-58

=== Individual ===
Real Valladolid

- Pichichi Trophy: 1957–58
- Top goalscorer of the 1953-58 Mediterranean Cup with 8 goals

=== Records ===
- All-time top goal scorer of Spain B with 8 goals
- All-time top goal scorer of the Mediterranean Cup with 8 goals
