= Mediterranean Cup (men's football) =

- Founded: 1949
- Abolished: 1958
- Region: Mediterranean
- Teams: 4 to 6 teams
- Last champions: Spain B
- Most championships: Italy B (2)

The Mediterranean Cup was an association football competition contested by men's national teams and national B teams of the states bordering the Mediterranean Sea. There have been three tournaments for the Mediterranean Cup: the first one was officially called Eastern Mediterranean Friendship Cup, the second was called Eastern Mediterranean Cup and the last one was just "Mediterranean Cup".

Italy, Egypt, Greece and Turkey were the four participants of the first two editions (Italy played with the national B team). Spain and France joined in the last edition (both with the national B team). The first edition, the only one with a permanent location, Athens, was played in 1949, lasted less than a month and was won by Italy B. The second edition, from 1950 to 1953, was won again by Italy B. The third and last edition, from 1953 to 1958, was won by Spain B.

Due to political/social reasons (tension between Greece and Turkey, troubles in Egypt) and the introduction of the European Championships in 1960, led to the abolition of further tournaments.

== Results ==
Period	Champion	Runner-up	Third place
1949	Italy B	Turkey	Egypt
1950–53	Italy B	Greece	Egypt
1953–58	Spain B	France B	Italy B

== 1949 ==
=== Results ===
Team	Pts	Pld	W	D	L	GF	GA	GD
Italy B	6	3	3	0	0	8	5	+3
Turkey	4	3	2	0	1	7	6	+1
Egypt	2	3	1	0	2	6	6	0
Greece	0	3	0	0	3	4	8	-4

12 May 1949

Egypt	2–3	Turkey
El-Attiyah 11'; Rahman 74'	Report	Kılıç 38'; Esel 46'; Gülesin 86'

Leoforos Alexandras Stadium, Athens, Greece
Attendance: 20,000
Referee: Agostino Gamba (Italy)

16 May 1949

Greece	1–2	Turkey
Markopoulos 49'	Report	Kılıç 33'; Esel 44'

Leoforos Alexandras Stadium, Athens, Greece
Attendance: 15,000
Referee: Mohammed Al Sayed (Egypt)

18 May 1949

Greece	1–3	Egypt
Chatzistavridis 4'	Report	El-Sabbagh 3', 85'; Hamdain 5'

Leoforos Alexandras Stadium, Athens, Greece
Attendance: 15,000
Referee: Agostino Gamba (Italy)

20 May 1949

Italy B	3–2	Turkey
Galassi 1'; Puccinelli 27', 85'	Report	Gülesin 10'; Esel 18'

Leoforos Alexandras Stadium, Athens, Greece
Attendance: 15,000
Referee: Vasilis Diamantopoulos (Greece)

22 May 1949

Egypt	1–2	Italy B
El-Attiyah 71'	Report	Remondini 44' Puccinelli 67'

Leoforos Alexandras Stadium, Athens, Greece
Attendance: 19,000
Referee: Sotiris Asprogerakas (Greece)

25 May 1949

Greece	2–3	Italy B
Stafylidis 54' Markopoulos 76'	Report	Baldini 48' Galassi 25', 68'

Leoforos Alexandras Stadium, Athens, Greece
Attendance: 15,000
Referee: Mohammed Al Sayed (Egypt)

=== Top Scorers ===
Player	Team	Goals
Aldo Puccinelli	Italy B	3
Bülent Esel	Turkey	3
Alberto Galassi	Italy B	3

== All-time top goalscorers ==
Rank	Name	Team	Goals	Apps	Ratio	Tournament(s)
1	(Spain) Manuel Badenes	Spain B	8	2	4	1953-58(8)
2	(Egypt) El-Sayed El-Dhizui	Egypt	7	12	0.58	1950-53(4) and 1953-58(3)
3	(Spain) Joaquín Peiró	Spain B	5	5	1	1953-58(5)
3	(Spain) Justo Tejada	Spain B	5	5	1	1953-58(5)
3	(Turkey) Bülent Esel	Turkey	5	6	0.83	1949(3) and 1950-53(2)
3	(Turkey) Lefter Küçükandonyadis	Turkey	5	9	0.56	1950-53(1) and 1953-58(4)
7	(Egypt) Toto	Turkey	4	8	0.5	1949(2) and 1950-53(2)
7	(Greece) Georgios Darivas	Greece	4	11	0.36	1950-53(4)

== Hat-tricks ==
Since the first official tournament in 1949, 5 hat-tricks have been scored in over 50 matches of the 3 editions of the tournament. The first hat-trick was scored by Georgios Darivas of Greece, playing against Turkey on 29 February 1952; and the last was by Joaquín Peiró, netting a hat-trick for Spain B in a 3-1 win over Italy B on 16 October 1958. The record for the most goals scored in a single Mediterranean Cup game is 4, which has been achieved on two occasion: both by Manuel Badenes when he scored 4 for Spain B in a 7-1 win over Greece and 4 again in a 5-1 win over Egypt. These two 4-goal haul single-handendely make him the all-time top goal scorer of the competition with 8 goals. Badenes is also the only player to have scored two hat-tricks in the Mediterranean Cup. Spain B holds the record for most hat-tricks scored with 3, and Egypt holds the record for most hat-tricks conceded with 2.

=== List ===
Mediterranean Cup hat-tricks
#	Player	G	Time of goals	For	Result	Against	Tournament	Date	FIFA report
1.	Georgios Darivas	3	15', 44', 80'	Greece	3–1	Turkey	1950-53 Mediterranean Cup	29 February 1952	Report
2.	Manuel Badenes	4	7', 35', 51', 58'	Spain B	7–1	Greece	1953–58 Mediterranean Cup	13 March 1955	Report
3.	Manuel Badenes (2)	4	47', 70', 73', 87'	Spain B	5–1	Egypt	1953–58 Mediterranean Cup	27 November 1955	Report
4.	Lefter Küçükandonyadis	3	3', 41', 65'	Turkey	4–0	Egypt	1953–58 Mediterranean Cup	5 April 1957	Report
5.	Joaquín Peiró	3	25', 49', 60'	Spain B	3–1	Italy B	1953–58 Mediterranean Cup	16 October 1958	Report

== See also ==
- Balkan Cup
- Baltic Cup
- Central European International Cup
- Nordic Football Championship
- Football at the Mediterranean Games
