= Greece national football team results (2000–2019) =

The Greece national football team results (2000–19) is a list of international matches played between 2000 and 2019.

== Matches ==
Win Draw Loss Fixtures

=== 2000 ===
23 February 2000 Friendly	Greece	4–1	Austria	Kalamata, Greece
	Georgiadis 36', 54'; Ouzounidis 82'; Lakis 90'	Report	Vastić 45'	Stadium: Messiniakos Stadium; Attendance: 5,589; Referee: Hugh Dallas (Scotland)

29 March 2000 Friendly	Greece	2–0	Romania	Athens, Greece
	Amanatidis 59'; Choutos 88'	Report		Stadium: Olympic Stadium; Attendance: 2,569; Referee: Alain Sars (France)

26 April 2000 Friendly	Republic of Ireland	0–1	Greece	Dublin, Ireland
19:00 UTC+1		Report	Lakis 15'	Stadium: Lansdowne Road; Attendance: 23,157; Referee: Hugh Dallas (Scotland)

3 June 2000 Friendly	Romania	2–1	Greece	Bucharest, Romania
	Ciobotariu 8'; Petre 78'	Report	Liberopoulos 83'	Stadium: Stadionul Steaua; Attendance: 12,000; Referee: Salomir Mircea (Romania)

16 August 2000 Friendly	Switzerland	2–2	Greece	St. Gallen, Switzerland
20:15 UTC+2	Comisetti 14'; Yakin 79'	Report	Ouzounidis 20'; Georgiadis 23'	Stadium: Espenmoos-Stadion; Attendance: 6,000; Referee: Tom Henning Øvrebø (Norway)

2 September 2000 2002 FIFA World Cup qualification	Germany	2–0	Greece	Hamburg, Germany
19:00 UTC+2	Deisler 18'; Scholl 78'			Stadium: Volksparkstadion; Attendance: 48,500; Referee: Antonio Lopez Nieto (Spain)

7 October 2000 2002 FIFA World Cup qualification	Greece	1–0	Finland	Athens, Greece
20:15 UTC+3	Liberopoulos 59'			Stadium: Olympic Stadium; Attendance: 15,000; Referee: Pierluigi Collina (Italy)

11 October 2000 2002 FIFA World Cup qualification	Albania	2–0	Greece	Tirana, Albania
19:00 UTC+2	Bushi 48'; Fakaj 90'			Stadium: Qemal Stafa Stadium; Attendance: 10,200; Referee: Rune Pedersen (Norway)

15 November 2000 Friendly	Greece	0–2	Slovakia	Rhodes, Greece
		Report	Sz. Németh 17'; P. Németh 72'	Stadium: Diagoras Stadium; Attendance: 1,500; Referee: Rune Pedersen (Norway)

13 December 2000 Friendly	Greece	1–1	FR Yugoslavia	Xanthi, Greece
17:00 UTC+2	Vokolos 86'	Report	Basinas 9' (o.g.)	Stadium: Xanthi Ground; Attendance: 2,100; Referee: Metin Tokat (Turkey)

=== 2001 ===
28 February 2001 Friendly	Greece	3–3	Russia	Heraklion, Greece
18:00 UTC+2	Charisteas 2', 32'; Basinas 90'	Report	Buznikin 34', 70'; Khokhlov 48'	Stadium: Theodoros Vardinogiannis Stadium; Attendance: 7,900; Referee: Graziano Cesari (Italy)

28 March 2001 2002 FIFA World Cup qualification	Greece	2–4	Germany	Athens, Greece
21:30 UTC+3	Charisteas 20'; Georgiadis 43'		Rehmer 6'; Ballack 25' (pen.); Klose 82'; Bode 90'	Stadium: Olympic Stadium; Attendance: 32,173; Referee: Vitor Melo Pereira (Portugal)

25 April 2001 Friendly	Croatia	2–2	Greece	Varaždin, Croatia
16:30 UTC+2	Vlaović 67'; Rapaić 90'	Report	Alexandris 38', 51'	Stadium: Stadion Varteks; Attendance: 9,390; Referee: Hartmut Strampe (Germany)

2 June 2001 2002 FIFA World Cup qualification	Greece	1–0	Albania	Heraklion, Greece
21:00 UTC+3	Machlas 70'			Stadium: Theodoros Vardinogiannis Stadium; Attendance: 5,500; Referee: Nikolai Levnikov (Russia)

6 June 2001 2002 FIFA World Cup qualification	Greece	0–2	England	Athens, Greece
21:45 UTC+3			Scholes 63'; Beckham 87'	Stadium: Olympic Stadium; Attendance: 29,300; Referee: Rune Pedersen (Norway)

15 August 2001 Friendly	Russia	0–0	Greece	Moscow, Russia
19:00 UTC+4				Stadium: Luzhniki Stadium; Attendance: 3,500; Referee: Jacek Granat (Poland)

5 September 2001 2002 FIFA World Cup qualification	Finland	5–1	Greece	Helsinki, Finland
19:00 UTC+3	Forssell 14', 45'; Riihilahti 21'; Kolkka 38'; Litmanen 53'		Karagounis 30'	Stadium: Olympiastadion; Attendance: 27,216; Referee: Paul Allaerts (Belgium)

6 October 2001 2002 FIFA World Cup qualification	England	2–2	Greece	Manchester, England
15:00 UTC+1	Sheringham 68'; Beckham 90+3'		Charisteas 36'; Nikolaidis 69'	Stadium: Old Trafford; Attendance: 66,000; Referee: Dick Jol (Netherlands)

10 November 2001 Friendly	Greece	4–2	Estonia	Athens, Greece
	Nikolaidis 6', 9'; Tsiartas 24'; Machlas 39'	Report	Viikmäe 44'; Zelinski 81' (pen.)	Stadium: Nikos Goumas Stadium; Attendance: 1,200; Referee: Roy Helge Olsen (Norway)

14 November 2001 Friendly	Greece	1–2	Cyprus	Athens, Greece
	Liberopoulos 86'	Report	Okkas 41'; Ioakim 88'	Stadium: Municipal Stadium of Kaisariani; Attendance: 1,500; Referee: Lubomír Puček (Czech Republic)

=== 2002 ===
13 February 2002 Friendly	Greece	2–2	Sweden	Thessaloniki, Greece
19:00 UTC+2	Fyssas 54'; Karagounis 85'	Report	Svensson 31'; Selaković 64'	Stadium: Kleanthis Vikelidis Stadium; Attendance: 14,000; Referee: Attila Ábrahám (Hungary)

27 March 2002 Friendly	Greece	3–2	Belgium	Patras, Greece
21:15 UTC+2	Tsiartas 61' (pen.); Vryzas 80', 87'	Report	Goor 29'; Sonck 55'	Stadium: Kostas Davourlis Stadium; Attendance: 9,400; Referee: Costas Kapitanis (Cyprus)

17 April 2002 Friendly	Greece	0–0	Czech Republic	Ioannina, Greece
21:15 UTC+3		Report		Stadium: Zosimades Stadium; Attendance: 7,000; Referee: Carlo Bertolini (Switzerland)

12 May 2002 Friendly	Greece	3–2	Romania	Alexandroupolis, Greece
	Nikolaidis 19'; Giannakopoulos 58'; Konstantinidis P. 72'		Ogăraru 54'; Tănasă 84'	Stadium: Alexandroupoli Municipal Stadium; Referee: Leif Sundell (Sweden)

15 May 2002 Friendly	Greece	3–1	Cyprus	Rhodes, Greece
	Fyssas 28', 33'; Amanatidis 79'	Report	Nicolaou 55'	Stadium: Diagoras Stadium; Attendance: 2,000; Referee: Juan Antonio Fernández Marín (Spain)

21 August 2002 Friendly	Romania	0–1	Greece	Constanța, Romania
20:45 UTC+3		Report	Giannakopoulos 17'	Stadium: Stadionul Gheorghe Hagi; Attendance: 15,000; Referee: Metin Tokat (Turkey)

5 September 2002 UEFA Euro 2004 qualifying	Greece	0–2	Spain	Athens, Greece
21:45 UTC+3			Raúl 8'; Valerón 77'	Stadium: Leoforos Alexandras Stadium; Attendance: 17,000; Referee: Markus Merk (Germany)

12 October 2002 UEFA Euro 2004 qualifying	Ukraine	2–0	Greece	Kyiv, Ukraine
19:00 UTC+3	Vorobey 51'; Voronin 90'			Stadium: Olimpiysky National Sports Complex; Attendance: 50,000; Referee: René Temmink (Netherlands)

16 October 2002 UEFA Euro 2004 qualifying	Greece	2–0	Armenia	Athens, Greece
20:00 UTC+03	Nikolaidis 2', 59'			Stadium: Leoforos Alexandras Stadium; Attendance: 6,000; Referee: Darko Čeferin (Slovenia)

20 November 2002 Friendly	Greece	0–0	Republic of Ireland	Athens, Greece
21:00 UTC+2		Report		Stadium: Leoforos Alexandras Stadium; Attendance: 2,100; Referee: Alfredo Trentalange (Italy)

=== 2003 ===
29 January 2003 Friendly	Cyprus	1–2	Greece	Larnaca, Cyprus
	Konstantinou 27' (pen.)	Report	Fyssas 53'; Choutos 70'	Stadium: GSZ Stadium; Attendance: 2,000; Referee: Loizos Loizou (Cyprus)

12 February 2003 Friendly	Greece	1–0	Norway	Heraklion, Greece
20:00 UTC+2	Kyrgiakos 26'	Report		Stadium: Theodoros Vardinogiannis Stadium; Attendance: 2,500; Referee: Paulo Manuel Gomes Costa (Portugal)

26 March 2003 Friendly	Austria	2–2	Greece	Graz, Austria
20:30 UTC+1	Schopp 54'; Haas 81'	Report	Tsiartas 47' (pen.); Kafes 50'	Stadium: Arnold Schwarzenegger Stadium; Attendance: 8,500; Referee: Tom Henning Øvrebø (Norway)

2 April 2003 UEFA Euro 2004 qualifying	Northern Ireland	0–2	Greece	Belfast, Northern Ireland
20:00 UTC+1			Charisteas 4', 55'	Stadium: Windsor Park; Attendance: 7,187; Referee: Grzegorz Gilewski (Poland)

30 April 2003 Friendly	Slovakia	2–2	Greece	Žilina, Slovakia
18:00 UTC+2	Sz. Németh 14', 87'	Report	Tsiartas 13' (pen.); Choutos 76'	Stadium: Štadión pod Dubňom; Attendance: 2,863; Referee: Stefan Messner (Austria)

7 June 2003 UEFA Euro 2004 qualifying	Spain	0–1	Greece	Zaragoza, Spain
21:45 UTC+2			Giannakopoulos 42'	Stadium: La Romareda; Attendance: 32,000; Referee: Alain Sars (France)

11 June 2003 UEFA Euro 2004 qualifying	Greece	1–0	Ukraine	Athens, Greece
21:00 UTC+3	Charisteas 86'			Stadium: Leoforos Alexandras Stadium; Attendance: 11,365; Referee: Claus Bo Larsen (Denmark)

20 August 2003 Friendly	Sweden	1–2	Greece	Norrköping, Sweden
20:15 UTC+2	Svensson 16'	Report	Giannakopoulos 63'; Kafes 65'	Stadium: Idrottsparken; Attendance: 12,035; Referee: Jouni Hyytiä (Finland)

6 September 2003 UEFA Euro 2004 qualifying	Armenia	0–1	Greece	Yerevan, Armenia
21:00 UTC+3			Vryzas 36'	Stadium: Hanrapetakan Stadium; Attendance: 6,500; Referee: René Temmink (Netherlands)

11 October 2003 UEFA Euro 2004 qualifying	Greece	1–0	Northern Ireland	Athens, Greece
19:00 UTC+3	Tsiartas 69' (pen.)			Stadium: Leoforos Alexandras Stadium; Attendance: 15,500; Referee: Lucílio Batista (Portugal)

15 November 2003 Friendly	Portugal	1–1	Greece	Aveiro, Portugal
21:15 UTC	Pauleta 60'	Report	Lakis 47'	Stadium: Estádio Municipal; Attendance: 32,000; Referee: Victor José Esquinas Torres (Spain)

=== 2004 ===
18 February 2004 Friendly	Greece	2–0	Bulgaria	Athens, Greece
21:00 UTC+2	Papadopoulos 25'; Vryzas 59'	Report		Stadium: Leoforos Alexandras Stadium; Attendance: 6,000; Referee: Graham Poll (England)

31 March 2004 Friendly	Greece	1–0	Switzerland	Heraklion, Greece
21:15 UTC+3	Tsiartas 56'	Report		Stadium: Pankritio Stadium; Attendance: 21,000; Referee: René Temmink (Netherlands)

28 April 2004 Friendly	Netherlands	4–0	Greece	Eindhoven, Netherlands
20:30 UTC+2	Makaay 50'; Zenden 58'; Heitinga 61'; Van Hooijdonk 89'	Report		Stadium: Philips Stadion; Attendance: 27,000; Referee: Cosimo Bolognino (Italy)

29 May 2004 Friendly	Poland	1–0	Greece	Szczecin, Poland
20:00 UTC+2	Kapsis 17' (o.g.)	Report		Stadium: Stadion Miejski; Attendance: 17,000; Referee: Petteri Kari (Finland)

3 June 2004 Friendly	Liechtenstein	0–2	Greece	Vaduz, Liechtenstein
20:30 UTC+2		Report	Vryzas 24'; Charisteas 89'	Stadium: Rheinpark Stadion; Attendance: 3,289; Referee: Nicole Petignat (Switzerland)

12 June 2004 UEFA Euro 2004 Group A	Portugal	1–2	Greece	Porto, Portugal
17:00 UTC+1	Ronaldo 90+3'		Karagounis 7'; Basinas 51' (pen.)	Stadium: Estádio do Dragão; Attendance: 48,761; Referee: Pierluigi Collina (Italy)

16 June 2004 UEFA Euro 2004 Group A	Greece	1–1	Spain	Porto, Portugal
17:00 UTC+1	Charisteas 66'		Morientes 28'	Stadium: Estádio do Bessa; Attendance: 25,444; Referee: Ľuboš Micheľ (Slovakia)

20 June 2004 UEFA Euro 2004 Group A	Russia	2–1	Greece	Faro/Loulé, Portugal
19:45 UTC+1	Kirichenko 2'; Bulykin 17'		Vryzas 43'	Stadium: Estádio Algarve; Attendance: 24,347; Referee: Gilles Veissière (France)

25 June 2004 UEFA Euro 2004 Quarter-finals	France	0–1	Greece	Lisbon, Portugal
19:45 UTC+1			Charisteas 65'	Stadium: Estádio José Alvalade; Attendance: 45,390; Referee: Anders Frisk (Sweden)

1 July 2004 UEFA Euro 2004 Semi-finals	Czech Republic	0–1 (a.e.t.)	Greece	Porto, Portugal
19:45 UTC+1			Dellas 105+1'	Stadium: Estádio do Dragão; Attendance: 42,449; Referee: Pierluigi Collina (Italy)

4 July 2004 UEFA Euro 2004 Final	Portugal	0–1	Greece	Lisbon, Portugal
19:45 UTC+1			Charisteas 57'	Stadium: Estádio da Luz; Attendance: 62,865; Referee: Markus Merk (Germany)

18 August 2004 Friendly	Czech Republic	0–0	Greece	Prague, Czech Republic
20:15 UTC+2		Report		Stadium: Stadion Evžena Rošického; Attendance: 15,050; Referee: Stuart Dougal (Scotland)

4 September 2004 2006 FIFA World Cup qualification	Albania	2–1	Greece	Tirana, Albania
	Murati 2'; Aliaj 11'		Giannakopoulos 38'	Stadium: Qemal Stafa Stadium; Attendance: 25,800; Referee: Eduardo Iturralde González (Spain)

8 September 2004 2006 FIFA World Cup qualification	Greece	0–0	Turkey	Piraeus, Greece
				Stadium: Karaiskakis Stadium; Attendance: 32,182; Referee: Anders Frisk (Sweden)

9 October 2004 2006 FIFA World Cup qualification	Ukraine	1–1	Greece	Kyiv, Ukraine
	Shevchenko 48'		Tsiartas 83'	Stadium: Olimpiysky National Sports Complex; Attendance: 56,000; Referee: Manuel Mejuto González (Spain)

17 November 2004 2006 FIFA World Cup qualification	Greece	3–1	Kazakhstan	Piraeus, Greece
	Charisteas 24', 46'; Katsouranis 85'		Baltiev 88'	Stadium: Karaiskakis Stadium; Attendance: 31,838; Referee: Kostadin Kostadinov (Bulgaria)

=== 2005 ===
9 February 2005 2006 FIFA World Cup qualification	Greece	2–1	Denmark	Piraeus, Greece
21:30 UTC+2	Zagorakis 25'; Basinas 32' (pen.)		Rommedahl 46'	Stadium: Karaiskakis Stadium; Attendance: 32,430; Referee: Pierluigi Collina (Italy)

26 March 2005 2006 FIFA World Cup qualification	Georgia	1–3	Greece	Tbilisi, Georgia
20:30 UTC+3	Asatiani 22'		Kapsis 43'; Vryzas 44'; Giannakopoulos 53'	Stadium: Mikheil Meskhi Stadium; Attendance: 23,000; Referee: Roberto Rosetti (Italy)

30 March 2005 2006 FIFA World Cup qualification	Greece	2–0	Albania	Piraeus, Greece
21:30 UTC+3	Charisteas 33'; Karagounis 84'			Stadium: Karaiskakis Stadium; Attendance: 31,700; Referee: Bertrand Layec (France)

4 June 2005 2006 FIFA World Cup qualification	Turkey	0–0	Greece	Istanbul, Turkey
21:00 UTC+3				Stadium: BJK İnönü Stadium; Attendance: 26,700; Referee: Markus Merk (Germany)

8 June 2005 2006 FIFA World Cup qualification	Greece	0–1	Ukraine	Piraeus, Greece
21:30 UTC+3			Husin 82'	Stadium: Karaiskakis Stadium; Attendance: 33,500; Referee: René Temmink (Netherlands)

16 June 2005 2005 FIFA Confederations Cup Group B	Brazil	3–0	Greece	Leipzig, Germany
20:45 UTC+2	Adriano 41'; Robinho 46'; Juninho 81'			Stadium: Zentralstadion; Attendance: 42,507; Referee: Ľuboš Micheľ (Slovakia)

19 June 2005 2005 FIFA Confederations Cup Group B	Greece	0–1	Japan	Frankfurt, Germany
18:00 UTC+2			Oguro 76'	Stadium: Waldstadion; Attendance: 34,314; Referee: Herbert Fandel (Germany)

22 June 2005 2005 FIFA Confederations Cup Group B	Greece	0–0	Mexico	Frankfurt, Germany
20:45 UTC+2				Stadium: Waldstadion; Attendance: 31,285; Referee: Carlos Amarilla (Paraguay)

17 August 2005 Friendly	Belgium	2–0	Greece	Brussels, Belgium
20:15 UTC+2	É. Mpenza 19'; M. Mpenza 63'	Report		Stadium: King Baudouin Stadium; Attendance: 20,000; Referee: Espen Berntsen (Norway)

7 September 2005 2006 FIFA World Cup qualification	Kazakhstan	1–2	Greece	Almaty, Kazakhstan
19:00 UTC+6	Zhalmagambetov 53'		Giannakopoulos 78'; Liberopoulos 90+4'	Stadium: Almaty Central Stadium; Attendance: 18,000; Referee: Alexandru Tudor (Romania)

8 October 2005 2006 FIFA World Cup qualification	Denmark	1–0	Greece	Copenhagen, Denmark
20:00 UTC+2	Gravgaard 40'			Stadium: Parken Stadium; Attendance: 42,099; Referee: Frank De Bleeckere (Belgium)

12 October 2005 2006 FIFA World Cup qualification	Greece	1–0	Georgia	Piraeus, Greece
19:00 UTC+3	Papadopoulos 17'			Stadium: Karaiskakis Stadium; Attendance: 28,186; Referee: Matteo Trefoloni (Italy)

16 November 2005 Friendly	Greece	2–1	Hungary	Piraeus, Greece
21:15 UTC+2	Giannakopoulos 31'; Kafes 90+'	Report	Kenesei 77'	Stadium: Karaiskakis Stadium; Attendance: 12,500; Referee: Pieter Vink (Netherlands)

=== 2006 ===
21 January 2006 2006 LG Cup	South Korea	1–1	Greece	Riyadh, Saudi Arabia
18:40 UTC+3	Park Chu-Young 24'	Report	Zagorakis 10'	Stadium: Prince Faisal bin Fahd Stadium; Attendance: 2,000; Referee: Daffer Al Shehri (Saudi Arabia)

25 January 2006 2006 LG Cup	Saudi Arabia	1–1	Greece	Riyadh, Saudi Arabia
20:10 UTC+3	Aziz 89'	Report	Zagorakis 59' (pen.)	Stadium: Prince Faisal bin Fahd Stadium; Attendance: 2,900; Referee: Abdullah Balideh (Qatar)

28 February 2006 Friendly	Belarus	0–1	Greece	Limassol, Cyprus
19:00 UTC+2		Report	Samaras 15'	Stadium: Tsirion Athletic Center; Attendance: 3,500; Referee: Salomir Mircea (Romania)

1 March 2006 Friendly	Greece	2–0	Kazakhstan	Nicosia, Cyprus
19:00 UTC+2	Samaras 68'; Giannakopoulos 90+1'	Report		Stadium: GSP Stadium; Attendance: 2,000; Referee: Panikos Kailis (Cyprus)

25 May 2006 Friendly	Australia	1–0	Greece	Melbourne, Australia
19:30 UTC+10	Skoko 16'	Report		Stadium: Melbourne Cricket Ground; Attendance: 95,103; Referee: Mike Riley (England)

16 August 2006 Friendly	England	4–0	Greece	Manchester, England
20:05 UTC+1	Terry 14'; Lampard 30'; Crouch 34', 42'	Report		Stadium: Old Trafford; Attendance: 45,864; Referee: Wolfgang Stark (Germany)

2 September 2006 UEFA Euro 2008 qualifying	Moldova	0–1	Greece	Chişinău, Moldova
20:15 UTC+3			Lyberopoulos 78'	Stadium: Zimbru Stadium; Attendance: 10,500; Referee: Matteo Trefoloni (Italy)

7 October 2006 UEFA Euro 2008 qualifying	Greece	1–0	Norway	Piraeus, Greece
21:30 UTC+3	Katsouranis 33'			Stadium: Karaiskakis Stadium; Attendance: 25,000; Referee: Lubos Michel (Slovakia)

11 October 2006 UEFA Euro 2008 qualifying	Bosnia and Herzegovina	0–4	Greece	Zenica, Bosnia and Herzegovina
19:15 UTC+2			Charisteas 8' (pen.); Patsatzoglou 82'; Samaras 85'; Katsouranis 90+4'	Stadium: Bilino Polje Stadium; Attendance: 10,000; Referee: Yuri Baskakov (Russia)

15 November 2006 Friendly	France	1–0	Greece	Saint-Denis, France
21:00 UTC+1	Henry 26'	Report		Stadium: Stade de France; Attendance: 63,680; Referee: Franz-Xaver Wack (Germany)

=== 2007 ===
6 February 2007 Friendly	Greece	0–1	South Korea	London, England
		Report	Lee Chun-soo 78'	Stadium: Craven Cottage; Attendance: 9,242; Referee: Mike Dean (England)

24 March 2007 UEFA Euro 2008 qualifying	Greece	1–4	Turkey	Piraeus, Greece
21:30 UTC+2	Kyrgiakos 6'		Şanlı 27'; Ünal 55'; Metin 70'; Karadeniz 81'	Stadium: Karaiskakis Stadium; Attendance: 34,000; Referee: Wolfgang Stark (Germany)

28 March 2007 UEFA Euro 2008 qualifying	Malta	0–1	Greece	Ta' Qali, Malta
19:30 UTC+2			Basinas 66' (pen.)	Stadium: Ta' Qali Stadium; Attendance: 15,000; Referee: Pedro Proença (Portugal)

2 June 2007 UEFA Euro 2008 qualifying	Greece	2–0	Hungary	Heraklion, Greece
21:30 UTC+3	Gekas 16'; Seitaridis 29'			Stadium: Pankritio Stadium (Note: Greece forced to play away from Athens for two matches after crowd disturbances in the game against Turkey on 24 March 2007.); Attendance: 16,000; Referee: Claus Bo Larsen (Denmark)

6 June 2007 UEFA Euro 2008 qualifying	Greece	2–1	Moldova	Heraklion, Greece
21:30 UTC+3	Charisteas 30'; Lyberopoulos 90+5'		Frunză 80'	Stadium: Pankritio Stadium; Attendance: 22,000; Referee: Jan Wegereef (Netherlands)

22 August 2007 Friendly	Greece	2–3	Spain	Thessaloniki, Greece
21:30 UTC+3	Gekas 17'; Katsouranis 43'	Report	Marchena 37'; Silva 66', 90+3'	Stadium: Toumba Stadium; Attendance: 13,000; Referee: Stéphane Lannoy (France)

12 September 2007 UEFA Euro 2008 qualifying	Norway	2–2	Greece	Oslo, Norway
19:00 UTC+2	Carew 15'; Riise 39'		Kyrgiakos 7', 30'	Stadium: Ullevaal Stadion; Attendance: 24,080; Referee: Massimo Busacca (Switzerland)

13 October 2007 UEFA Euro 2008 qualifying	Greece	3–2	Bosnia and Herzegovina	Athens, Greece
21:30 UTC+3	Charisteas 10'; Gekas 57'; Lyberopoulos 72'		Hrgović 54'; Ibišević 90'	Stadium: Olympic Stadium; Attendance: 35,000; Referee: Grzegorz Gilewski (Poland)

17 October 2007 UEFA Euro 2008 qualifying	Turkey	0–1	Greece	Istanbul, Turkey
20:30 UTC+3			Amanatidis 79'	Stadium: Ali Sami Yen Stadium; Attendance: 24,000; Referee: Manuel Mejuto González (Spain)

17 November 2007 UEFA Euro 2008 qualifying	Greece	5–0	Malta	Athens, Greece
21:30 UTC+2	Gekas 32', 72', 74'; Basinas 54'; Amanatidis 61'			Stadium: Olympic Stadium; Attendance: 35,000; Referee: Sten Kaldma (Estonia)

21 November 2007 UEFA Euro 2008 qualifying	Hungary	1–2	Greece	Budapest, Hungary
20:15 UTC+1	Buzsáky 7'		Vanczák 22' (o.g.); Basinas 59' (pen.)	Stadium: Puskás Ferenc Stadium; Attendance: 32,300; Referee: Rob Styles (England)

=== 2008 ===
6 February 2008 Friendly	Finland	1–2	Greece	Nicosia, Cyprus
21:00 UTC+2	Litmanen 66'	Report	Charisteas 67'; Katsouranis 72'	Stadium: GSP Stadium; Attendance: 3,000; Referee: Panikos Kailis (Cyprus)

26 March 2008 Friendly	Greece	2–1	Portugal	Düsseldorf, Germany
20:30 UTC+1	Karagounis 33', 60'	Report	Nuno Gomes 75'	Stadium: LTU Arena; Attendance: 28,500; Referee: Knut Kircher (Germany)

19 May 2008 Friendly	Greece	2–0	Cyprus	Patras, Greece
21:15 UTC+3	Ninis 5'; Katsouranis 59' (pen.)	Report		Stadium: Pampeloponnisiako Stadium; Attendance: 16,216; Referee: Dougie McDonald (Scotland)

24 May 2008 Friendly	Hungary	3–2	Greece	Budapest, Hungary
19:00 UTC+2	Dzsudzsák 46'; Juhász 59'; Vadócz 63'	Report	Amanatidis 45'; Lyberopoulos 90+1'	Stadium: Puskás Ferenc Stadium; Attendance: 6,500; Referee: Kevin Blom (Netherlands)

1 June 2008 Friendly	Greece	0–0	Armenia	Offenbach am Main, Germany
20:15 UTC+2		Report		Stadium: Stadion am Bieberer Berg; Attendance: 8,032; Referee: Babak Rafati (Germany)

10 June 2008 UEFA Euro 2008 Group D	Greece	0–2	Sweden	Salzburg, Austria
20:45 UTC+2		Report	Ibrahimović 67'; Hansson 72'	Stadium: Stadion Wals-Siezenheim; Attendance: 31,063; Referee: Massimo Busacca (Switzerland)

14 June 2008 UEFA Euro 2008 Group D	Greece	0–1	Russia	Salzburg, Austria
20:45 UTC+2		Report	Zyryanov 33'	Stadium: Stadion Wals-Siezenheim; Attendance: 31,063; Referee: Roberto Rosetti (Italy)

18 June 2008 UEFA Euro 2008 Group D	Greece	1–2	Spain	Salzburg, Austria
20:45 UTC+2	Charisteas 42'	Report	De la Red 61'; Güiza 88'	Stadium: Stadion Wals-Siezenheim; Attendance: 30,883; Referee: Howard Webb (England)

20 August 2008 Friendly	Slovakia	0–2	Greece	Bratislava, Slovakia
20:15 UTC+2		Report	Gekas 62', 86'	Stadium: Tehelné pole Attendance: 4,000; Referee: Fábián Mihály (Hungary)

6 September 2008 2010 FIFA World Cup qualification	Luxembourg	0–3	Greece	Luxembourg City, Luxembourg
20:15 UTC+2		Report	Torosidis 36'; Gekas 45+1'; Charisteas 76' (pen.)	Stadium: Stade Josy Barthel; Attendance: 4,596; Referee: Anders Hermansen (Denmark)

10 September 2008 2010 FIFA World Cup qualification	Latvia	0–2	Greece	Riga, Latvia
21:15 UTC+3		Report	Gekas 10', 49'	Stadium: Skonto Stadions; Attendance: 8,600; Referee: Tony Chapron (France)

11 October 2008 2010 FIFA World Cup qualification	Greece	3–0	Moldova	Piraeus, Greece
21:30 UTC+3	Charisteas 31', 51'; Katsouranis 40'	Report		Stadium: Karaiskakis Stadium; Attendance: 13,684; Referee: Espen Berntsen (Norway)

15 October 2008 2010 FIFA World Cup qualification	Greece	1–2	Switzerland	Piraeus, Greece
21:30 UTC+3	Charisteas 68'	Report	Frei 42' (pen.); Nkufo 77'	Stadium: Karaiskakis Stadium; Attendance: 28,810; Referee: Luis Medina Cantalejo (Spain)

19 November 2008 Friendly	Greece	1–1	Italy	Piraeus, Greece
21:30 UTC+3	Gekas 50'	Report	Toni 54'	Stadium: Karaiskakis Stadium; Attendance: 7,000; Referee: Howard Webb (England)

=== 2009 ===
11 February 2009 Friendly	Greece	1–1	Denmark	Piraeus, Greece
21:15 UTC+2	Gekas 61'	Report	Borring 49'	Stadium: Karaiskakis Stadium; Attendance: 5,000; Referee: Alberto Undiano Mallenco (Spain)

28 March 2009 2010 FIFA World Cup qualification	Israel	1–1	Greece	Ramat Gan, Israel
21:00 UTC+2	Golan 55'	Report	Gekas 42'	Stadium: Ramat Gan Stadium; Attendance: 38,000; Referee: Roberto Rosetti (Italy)

1 April 2009 2010 FIFA World Cup qualification	Greece	2–1	Israel	Heraklion, Greece
21:30 UTC+3	Salpingidis 32'; Samaras 67' (pen.)	Report	Barda 60'	Stadium: Pankritio Stadium; Attendance: 22,794; Referee: Olegário Benquerença (Portugal)

12 August 2009 Friendly	Poland	2–0	Greece	Bydgoszcz, Poland
20:30 UTC+2	Obraniak 47', 79'	Report		Stadium: Zdzisław Krzyszkowiak Stadium; Attendance: 19,000; Referee: Kenji Ogiya (Japan)

5 September 2009 2010 FIFA World Cup qualification	Switzerland	2–0	Greece	Basel, Switzerland
20:30 UTC+2	Grichting 84'; Padalino 87'	Report		Stadium: St. Jakob-Park; Attendance: 38,500; Referee: Frank De Bleeckere (Belgium)

9 September 2009 2010 FIFA World Cup qualification	Moldova	1–1	Greece	Chișinău, Moldova
21:30 UTC+3	Andronic 90'	Report	Gekas 33'	Stadium: Zimbru Stadium; Attendance: 9,870; Referee: Daniel Stålhammar (Sweden)

10 October 2009 2010 FIFA World Cup qualification	Greece	5–2	Latvia	Athens, Greece
21:30 UTC+3	Gekas 4', 47' (pen.), 57', 90+1'; Samaras 73'	Report	Verpakovskis 12', 40'	Stadium: Olympic Stadium; Attendance: 18,981; Referee: Tom Henning Øvrebø (Norway)

14 October 2009 2010 FIFA World Cup qualification	Greece	2–1	Luxembourg	Athens, Greece
21:00 UTC+3	Torosidis 30'; Gekas 33'	Report	Papadopoulos 90' (o.g.)	Stadium: Olympic Stadium; Attendance: 13,932; Referee: Darko Čeferin (Slovenia)

14 November 2009 2010 FIFA World Cup qualification R2	Greece	0–0	Ukraine	Athens, Greece
20:00 UTC+2		Report		Stadium: Olympic Stadium; Attendance: 39,045; Referee: Laurent Duhamel (France)

18 November 2009 2010 FIFA World Cup qualification R2	Ukraine	0–1 (0–1 agg.)	Greece	Donetsk, Ukraine
20:00 UTC+2		Report	Salpingidis 31'	Stadium: Donbas Arena; Attendance: 31,643; Referee: Olegário Benquerença (Portugal)

=== 2010 ===
3 March 2010 Friendly	Greece	0–2	Senegal	Volos, Greece
17:00 UTC+2		Report	Niang 71'; N'Daw 82'	Stadium: Panthessaliko Stadium; Attendance: 10,000; Referee: Damir Skomina (Slovenia)

25 May 2010 Friendly	North Korea	2–2	Greece	Altach, Austria
20:00 UTC+2	Jong Tae-se 23', 52'	Report	Katsouranis 2'; Charisteas 49'	Stadium: Cashpoint Arena; Attendance: 3,000; Referee: Robert Schörgenhofer (Austria)

2 June 2010 Friendly	Paraguay	2–0	Greece	Winterthur, Switzerland
18:30 UTC+2	Vera 9'; Barrios 25'	Report		Stadium: Stadion Schützenwiese; Attendance: 5,200; Referee: Cyril Zimmermann (Switzerland)

12 June 2010 2010 FIFA World Cup Group B	South Korea	2–0	Greece	Port Elizabeth, South Africa
13:30 UTC+2	Lee Jung-soo 7'; Park Ji-sung 52'	Report		Stadium: Nelson Mandela Bay Stadium; Attendance: 31,513; Referee: Michael Hester (New Zealand)

17 June 2010 2010 FIFA World Cup Group B	Greece	2–1	Nigeria	Bloemfontein, South Africa
16:00 UTC+2	Salpingidis 44'; Torosidis 71'	Report	Uche 16'	Stadium: Free State Stadium; Attendance: 31,593; Referee: Óscar Ruiz (Colombia)

22 June 2010 2010 FIFA World Cup Group B	Greece	0–2	Argentina	Polokwane, South Africa
20:30 UTC+2		Report	Demichelis 77'; Palermo 89'	Stadium: Peter Mokaba Stadium; Attendance: 38,891; Referee: Ravshan Irmatov (Uzbekistan)

11 August 2010 Friendly	Serbia	0–1	Greece	Belgrade, Serbia
20:30 UTC+2		Report	Salpingidis 45'	Stadium: Partizan Stadium; Attendance: 10,000; Referee: Fernando Teixeira Vitienes (Spain)

3 September 2010 UEFA Euro 2012 qualifying	Greece	1–1	Georgia	Piraeus, Greece
21:45 UTC+3	Spyropoulos 72'	Report	Iashvili 3'	Stadium: Karaiskakis Stadium; Attendance: 14,794; Referee: Carlos Clos Gómez (Spain)

7 September 2010 UEFA Euro 2012 qualifying	Croatia	0–0	Greece	Zagreb, Croatia
20:30 UTC+2		Report		Stadium: Maksimir Stadium; Attendance: 24,399; Referee: Claus Bo Larsen (Denmark)

8 October 2010 UEFA Euro 2012 qualifying	Greece	1–0	Latvia	Piraeus, Greece
21:45 UTC+3	Torosidis 58'	Report		Stadium: Karaiskakis Stadium; Attendance: 13,520; Referee: Antonio Damato (Italy)

12 October 2010 UEFA Euro 2012 qualifying	Greece	2–1	Israel	Piraeus, Greece
21:45 UTC+3	Salpingidis 22'; Karagounis 63' (pen.)	Report	Spyropoulos 59' (o.g.)	Stadium: Karaiskakis Stadium; Attendance: 16,935; Referee: Martin Hansson (Sweden)

17 November 2010 Friendly	Austria	1–2	Greece	Vienna, Austria
20:30 UTC+1	Fuchs 67'	Report	Samaras 49'; Fotakis 81'	Stadium: Ernst-Happel-Stadion; Attendance: 16,200; Referee: Sascha Kever (Switzerland)

=== 2011 ===
9 February 2011 Friendly	Greece	1–0	Canada	Larissa, Greece
17:00 UTC+2	Fetfatzidis 63'	Report		Stadium: AEL FC Arena; Attendance: 14,000; Referee: Svein Oddvar Moen (Norway)

26 March 2011 UEFA Euro 2012 qualifying	Malta	0–1	Greece	Ta'Qali, Malta
20:30 UTC+1		Report	Torosidis 90+4'	Stadium: Ta'Qali Stadium; Attendance: 10,605; Referee: Michael Weiner (Germany)

29 March 2011 Friendly	Greece	0–0	Poland	Piraeus, Greece
21:30 UTC+3		Report		Stadium: Karaiskakis Stadium; Attendance: 12,000; Referee: Martin Atkinson (England)

4 June 2011 UEFA Euro 2012 qualifying	Greece	3–1	Malta	Piraeus, Greece
21:30 UTC+3	Fetfatzidis 8', 64'; K. Papadopoulos 26'	Report	Mifsud 54'	Stadium: Karaiskakis Stadium; Attendance: 14,746; Referee: Pawel Gil (Poland)

8 June 2011 Friendly	Ecuador	1–1	Greece	New York City, United States
20:00 UTC−5	Erazo 58'	Report	Tziolis 15'	Stadium: Citi Field; Attendance: 39,656; Referee: Svein Oddvar Moen (Norway)

10 August 2011 Friendly	Bosnia and Herzegovina	0–0	Greece	Sarajevo, Bosnia and Herzegovina
21:00 UTC+2		Report		Stadium: Asim Ferhatović Hase Stadium; Attendance: 10,000; Referee: Nikola Dabanović (Montenegro)

2 September 2011 UEFA Euro 2012 qualifying	Israel	0–1	Greece	Tel Aviv, Israel
16:05 UTC+3		Report	Ninis 60'	Stadium: Bloomfield Stadium; Attendance: 13,100; Referee: Craig Thomson (Scotland)

6 September 2011 UEFA Euro 2012 qualifying	Latvia	1–1	Greece	Riga, Latvia
21:30 UTC+3	Cauņa 19'	Report	K. Papadopoulos 84'	Stadium: Skonto Stadium; Attendance: 5,415; Referee: Stanislav Todorov (Bulgaria)

7 October 2011 UEFA Euro 2012 qualifying	Greece	2–0	Croatia	Piraeus, Greece
21:45 UTC+3	Samaras 71'; Gekas 79'	Report		Stadium: Karaiskakis Stadium; Attendance: 27,200; Referee: Howard Webb (England)

11 October 2011 UEFA Euro 2012 qualifying	Georgia	1–2	Greece	Tbilisi, Georgia
21:00 UTC+4	Targamadze 19'	Report	Fotakis 79'; Charisteas 85'	Stadium: Mikheil Meskhi Stadium; Attendance: 7,824; Referee: Daniele Orsato (Italy)

11 November 2011 Friendly	Greece	1–1	Russia	Piraeus, Greece
21:30 UTC+3	Katsouranis 60'	Report	Shirokov 2'	Stadium: Karaiskakis Stadium; Attendance: 9,772; Referee: Tony Chapron (France)

15 November 2011 Friendly	Greece	1–3	Romania	Altach, Austria
21:30 UTC+3	Karagounis 34'	Report	Torje 17'; Tănase 61'; Chipciu 81'	Stadium: Cashpoint Arena; Attendance: 1,500; Referee: Thomas Gangl (Austria)

=== 2012 ===
29 February 2012 Friendly	Greece	1–1	Belgium	Heraklion, Greece
21:30 UTC+2	Salpingidis 8'	Report	Chadli 31'	Stadium: Pankritio Stadium; Attendance: 15,000; Referee: Daniel Stålhammar (Sweden)

26 May 2012 Friendly	Greece	1–1	Slovenia	Kufstein, Austria
20:30 UTC+2	Torosidis 8'	Report	Kurtić 87'	Stadium: Kufstein Arena; Attendance: 1,000; Referee: Robert Schörgenhofer (Austria)

31 May 2012 Friendly	Armenia	0–1	Greece	Kufstein, Austria
20:30 UTC+2		Report	K. Papadopoulos 24'	Stadium: Kufstein Arena; Attendance: 600; Referee: Alexander Harkam (Austria)

8 June 2012 UEFA Euro 2012 Group A	Poland	1–1	Greece	Warsaw, Poland
18:00 UTC+2	Lewandowski 17'	Report	Salpingidis 51'	Stadium: National Stadium; Attendance: 56,070; Referee: Carlos Velasco Carballo (Spain)

12 June 2012 UEFA Euro 2012 Group A	Greece	1–2	Czech Republic	Wrocław, Poland
18:00 UTC+2	Gekas 53'	Report	Jiráček 3'; Pilař 6'	Stadium: Municipal Stadium; Attendance: 41,105; Referee: Stéphane Lannoy (France)

16 June 2012 UEFA Euro 2012 Group A	Greece	1–0	Russia	Warsaw, Poland
20:45 UTC+2	Karagounis 45+2'	Report		Stadium: National Stadium; Attendance: 55,614; Referee: Jonas Eriksson (Sweden)

22 June 2012 UEFA Euro 2012 Quarter-finals	Germany	4–2	Greece	Gdańsk, Poland
20:45 UTC+2	Lahm 39'; Khedira 61'; Klose 68'; Reus 74'	Report	Samaras 55'; Salpingidis 89' (pen.)	Stadium: PGE Arena; Attendance: 38,751; Referee: Damir Skomina (Slovenia)

15 August 2012 Friendly	Norway	2–3	Greece	Oslo, Norway
20:00 UTC+2	Hangeland 13'; Riise 75'	Report	Torosidis 7'; K. Papadopoulos 11'; Mitroglou 56'	Stadium: Ullevaal Stadion; Attendance: 13,680; Referee: Alan Kelly (Republic of Ireland)

7 September 2012 2014 FIFA World Cup qualification	Latvia	1–2	Greece	Riga, Latvia
21:30 UTC+3	Cauņa 41' (pen.)	Report	Spyropoulos 57'; Gekas 69'	Stadium: Skonto stadions Attendance: 7,956; Referee: Ivan Bebek (Croatia)

11 September 2012 2014 FIFA World Cup qualification	Greece	2–0	Lithuania	Piraeus, Greece
21:45 UTC+3	Ninis 55'; Mitroglou 72'	Report		Stadium: Karaiskakis Stadium; Attendance: 21,466; Referee: Mark Courtney (Northern Ireland)

12 October 2012 2014 FIFA World Cup qualification	Greece	0–0	Bosnia and Herzegovina	Piraeus, Greece
21:45 UTC+3		Report		Stadium: Karaiskakis Stadium; Attendance: 26,211; Referee: Antonio Damato (Italy)

16 October 2012 2014 FIFA World Cup qualification	Slovakia	0–1	Greece	Bratislava, Slovakia
20:30 UTC+2		Report	Salpingidis 63'	Stadium: Štadión Pasienky; Attendance: 7,494; Referee: William Collum (Scotland)

14 November 2012 Friendly	Republic of Ireland	0–1	Greece	Dublin, Republic of Ireland
19:45 UTC±0		Report	Holebas 29'	Stadium: Aviva Stadium; Attendance: 16,256; Referee: Eitan Shemeulevitch (Israel)

=== 2013 ===
6 February 2013 Friendly	Greece	0–0	Switzerland	Piraeus, Greece
21:30 UTC+2		Report		Stadium: Karaiskakis Stadium; Attendance: 7,500; Referee: Alberto Undiano Mallenco (Slovakia)

22 March 2013 2014 FIFA World Cup qualification	Bosnia and Herzegovina	3–1	Greece	Zenica, Bosnia and Herzegovina
20:45 UTC+1	Džeko 29', 53'; Ibišević 36'	Report	Gekas 90+3'	Stadium: Bilino Polje Stadium; Attendance: 11,000; Referee: Björn Kuipers (Netherlands)

7 June 2013 2014 FIFA World Cup qualification	Lithuania	0–1	Greece	Vilnius, Lithuania
21:45 UTC+3		Report	Christodoulopoulos 20'	Stadium: LFF stadionas Attendance: 4,500; Referee: Olegário Benquerença (Portugal)

14 August 2013 Friendly	Austria	0–2	Greece	Wals-Siezenheim, Austria
20:30 UTC+2		Report	Mitroglou 39', 67'	Stadium: Red Bull Arena; Attendance: 23,400; Referee: Richard Trutz (Slovakia)

6 September 2013 2014 FIFA World Cup qualification	Liechtenstein	0–1	Greece	Vaduz, Liechtenstein
20:45 UTC+2		Report	Mitroglou 72'	Stadium: Rheinpark Stadion; Attendance: 2,680; Referee: Stanislav Todorov (Bulgaria)

10 September 2013 2014 FIFA World Cup qualification	Greece	1–0	Latvia	Piraeus, Greece
21:45 UTC+3	Salpingidis 58'	Report		Stadium: Karaiskakis Stadium; Attendance: 18,983; Referee: Kristinn Jakobsson (Iceland)

11 October 2013 2014 FIFA World Cup qualification	Greece	1–0	Slovakia	Piraeus, Greece
21:45 UTC+3	Škrtel 44' (o.g.)	Report		Stadium: Karaiskakis Stadium; Attendance: 21,067; Referee: Deniz Aytekin (Germany)

15 October 2013 2014 FIFA World Cup qualification	Greece	2–0	Liechtenstein	Piraeus, Greece
20:00 UTC+3	Salpingidis 11'; Karagounis 81'	Report		Stadium: Karaiskakis Stadium; Attendance: 18,676; Referee: Libor Kovařík (Czech Republic)

15 November 2013 2014 FIFA World Cup qualification R2	Greece	3–1	Romania	Piraeus, Greece
21:45 UTC+2	Mitroglou 14', 66'; Salpingidis 20'	Report	Stancu 19'	Stadium: Karaiskakis Stadium; Attendance: 28,200; Referee: Pedro Proença (Portugal)

19 November 2013 2014 FIFA World Cup qualification R2	Romania	1–1 (2–4 agg.)	Greece	Bucharest, Romania
21:00 UTC+2	Torosidis 55' (o.g.)	Report	Mitroglou 23'	Stadium: Arena Națională; Attendance: 49,793; Referee: Milorad Mažić (Serbia)

=== 2014 ===
5 March 2014 Friendly	Greece	0–2	South Korea	Piraeus, Greece
19:00 UTC+2		Report	Chu-young Park 18'; Heung Min Son 55'	Stadium: Karaiskakis Stadium; Attendance: 7,600; Referee: Ovidiu Hațegan (Romania)

31 May 2014 Friendly	Portugal	0–0	Greece	Lisbon, Portugal
20:30 UTC+2		Report		Stadium: Estádio Nacional; Attendance: 33,556; Referee: Kevin Blom (Netherlands)

3 June 2014 Friendly	Greece	0–0	Nigeria	Chester, United States
18:00 UTC−5		Report		Stadium: PPL Park; Attendance: 10,131; Referee: Elmer Bonilla (El Salvador)

6 June 2014 Friendly	Greece	2–1	Bolivia	Harrison, United States
19:00 UTC−5	Kone 21'; Katsouranis 54'	Report	Cardozo 70'	Stadium: Red Bull Arena; Attendance: 11.024; Referee: Javier Santos (Puerto Rico)

14 June 2014 2014 FIFA World Cup Group C	Colombia	3–0	Greece	Belo Horizonte, Brazil
13:00 UTC−3	Armero 5'; Gutiérrez 58'; Rodríguez 90+3'	Report		Stadium: Estádio Mineirão; Attendance: 57,174; Referee: Mark Geiger (United States)

19 June 2014 2014 FIFA World Cup Group C	Japan	0–0	Greece	Natal, Brazil
19:00 UTC−3		Report		Stadium: Arena das Dunas; Attendance: 39,485; Referee: Joel Aguilar (El Salvador)

24 June 2014 2014 FIFA World Cup Group C	Greece	2–1	Ivory Coast	Fortaleza, Brazil
17:00 UTC−3	Samaris 42'; Samaras 90+3' (pen.)	Report	Bony 74'	Stadium: Estádio Castelão; Attendance: 59,095; Referee: Carlos Vera (Ecuador)

29 June 2014 2014 FIFA World Cup Round of 16	Costa Rica	1–1 (a.e.t.) (5–3 p)	Greece	Recife, Brazil
17:00 UTC−3	Ruiz 52'	Report	Papastathopoulos 90+1'	Stadium: Arena Pernambuco; Attendance: 41,242; Referee: Ben Williams (Australia)
	Penalties
	Borges (penalty scored); Ruiz (penalty scored); González (penalty scored); Campbell (penalty scored); Umaña (penalty scored)		(penalty scored) Mitroglou; (penalty scored) Christodoulopoulos; (penalty scored) Holebas; (penalty missed) Gekas

7 September 2014 UEFA Euro 2016 qualifying	Greece	0–1	Romania	Piraeus, Greece
21:45 UTC+3		Report	Marica 10' (pen.)	Stadium: Karaiskakis Stadium; Attendance: 0 (Note: Greece played their home match against Romania behind closed doors as they were punished for previous crowd disturbances.); Referee: Mark Clattenburg (England)

11 October 2014 UEFA Euro 2016 qualifying	Finland	1–1	Greece	Helsinki, Finland
21:45 UTC+3	Hurme 55'	Report	Karelis 24'	Stadium: Olympiastadion; Attendance: 26,548; Referee: David Fernández Borbalán (Spain)

14 October 2014 UEFA Euro 2016 qualifying	Greece	0–2	Northern Ireland	Piraeus, Greece
21:45 UTC+3		Report	Ward 9'; K. Lafferty 51'	Stadium: Karaiskakis Stadium; Attendance: 18,726; Referee: Stéphane Lannoy (France)

14 November 2014 UEFA Euro 2016 qualifying	Greece	0–1	Faroe Islands	Piraeus, Greece
21:45 UTC+2		Report	Edmundsson 61'	Stadium: Karaiskakis Stadium; Attendance: 16,821; Referee: Nicola Rizzoli (Italy)

18 November 2014 Friendly	Greece	0–2	Serbia	Chania, Greece
19:00 UTC+2		Report	Petrović 60'; Gudelj 90'	Stadium: Perivolia Municipal Stadium; Attendance: 4,000; Referee: Neil Doyle (Ireland)

=== 2015 ===
29 March 2015 UEFA Euro 2016 qualifying	Hungary	0–0	Greece	Budapest, Hungary
20:45 UTC+2		Report		Stadium: Groupama Arena; Attendance: 22,000; Referee: Sergei Karasev (Russia)

13 June 2015 UEFA Euro 2016 qualifying	Faroe Islands	2–1	Greece	Tórshavn, Faroe Islands
19:45 UTC+1	Hansson 32'; B. Olsen 70'	Report	Papastathopoulos 84'	Stadium: Tórsvøllur; Attendance: 4,731; Referee: Tom Harald Hagen (Norway)

16 June 2015 Friendly	Poland	0–0	Greece	Gdańsk, Poland
20:45 UTC+2		Report		Stadium: Stadion Energa Gdańsk; Attendance: 37,192; Referee: Alain Bieri (Switzerland)

4 September 2015 UEFA Euro 2016 qualifying	Greece	0–1	Finland	Piraeus, Greece
21:45 UTC+3		Report	Pohjanpalo 75'	Stadium: Karaiskakis Stadium; Attendance: 17,358; Referee: Serhiy Boyko (Ukraine)

7 September 2015 UEFA Euro 2016 qualifying	Romania	0–0	Greece	Bucharest, Romania
21:45 UTC+3		Report		Stadium: Arena Națională; Attendance: 38,153; Referee: Aleksei Kulbakov (Belarus)

8 October 2015 UEFA Euro 2016 qualifying	Northern Ireland	3–1	Greece	Belfast, Northern Ireland
19:45 UTC+1	Davis 35', 58'; Magennis 49'	Report	Aravidis 87'	Stadium: Windsor Park; Attendance: 11,700; Referee: Bas Nijhuis (Netherlands)

11 October 2015 UEFA Euro 2016 qualifying	Greece	4–3	Hungary	Piraeus, Greece
19:00 UTC+3	Stafylidis 5'; Tachtsidis 57'; Mitroglou 79'; Kone 86'	Report	Lovrencsics 26'; K. Németh 55', 75'	Stadium: Karaiskakis Stadium; Attendance: 9,500; Referee: Ivan Bebek (Croatia)

13 November 2015 Friendly	Luxembourg	1–0	Greece	Differdange, Luxembourg
19:30 UTC+1	Joachim 90+1'	Report		Stadium: Stade Municipal; Attendance: 1,894; Referee: Tim Marshal (Northern Ireland)

17 November 2015 Friendly	Turkey	3–0 (Awarded)	Greece	Istanbul, Turkey
20:15 UTC+2		Report		Stadium: Başakşehir Fatih Terim Stadium; Attendance: 17,000; Referee: Paolo Valeri (Italy)
Note: The game originally ended 0–0 but it was awarded to Turkey for the usage of an ineligible player, Apostolos Giannou by Greece.

=== 2016 ===
24 March 2016 Friendly	Greece	2–1	Montenegro	Piraeus, Greece
20:00 UTC+2	Tzavellas 54'; Karelis 62'	Report	Tomašević 56'	Stadium: Karaiskakis Stadium; Attendance: 4,450; Referee: István Kovács (Romania)

29 March 2016 Friendly	Greece	2–3	Iceland	Piraeus, Greece
20:30 UTC+3	Fortounis 19', 31'	Report	Traustason 34'; Ingason 69'; Sigþórsson 82'	Stadium: Karaiskakis Stadium; Attendance: 5,592; Referee: Javier Estrada Fernández (Spain)

4 June 2016 Friendly	Australia	1–0	Greece	Sydney, Australia
20:00 UTC+10	Leckie 90+3'	Report		Stadium: ANZ Stadium; Attendance: 38,682; Referee: Jumpei Iida (Japan)

7 June 2016 Friendly	Australia	1–2	Greece	Melbourne, Australia
20:00 (UTC+10)	Sainsbury 58'	Report	Mantalos 8'; Maniatis 20'	Stadium: Etihad Stadium; Attendance: 33,622; Referee: Robert Madley (England)

1 September 2016 Friendly	Netherlands	1–2	Greece	Eindhoven, Netherlands
20:45 UTC+2	Wijnaldum 14'	Report	Mitroglou 29'; Gianniotas 74'	Stadium: Philips Stadion; Attendance: 36,128; Referee: Mete Kalkavan (Turkey)

6 September 2016 2018 FIFA World Cup qualification	Gibraltar	1–4	Greece	Algarve, Portugal
19:45 UTC+1	Walker 26'	Report (FIFA); Report (UEFA)	Mitroglou 10'; Wiseman 44' (o.g.); Fortounis 45'; Torosidis 45+2'	Stadium: Estádio Algarve; Attendance: 460; Referee: Jakob Kehlet (Denmark)

7 October 2016 2018 FIFA World Cup qualification	Greece	2–0	Cyprus	Piraeus, Greece
21:45 UTC+3	Mitroglou 12'; Mantalos 42'	Report (FIFA); Report (UEFA)		Stadium: Karaiskakis Stadium; Attendance: 16,512; Referee: Pavel Královec (Czech Republic)

10 October 2016 2018 FIFA World Cup qualification	Estonia	0–2	Greece	Tallinn, Estonia
21:45 UTC+3		Report (FIFA); Report (UEFA)	Torosidis 2'; Stafylidis 60'	Stadium: A. Le Coq Arena; Attendance: 4,467; Referee: István Vad (Hungary)

9 November 2016 Friendly	Greece	0–1	Belarus	Piraeus, Greece
21:15 UTC+2		Report	Palitsevich 14'	Stadium: Karaiskakis Stadium; Attendance: 3,108; Referee: Craig Pawson (England)

13 November 2016 2018 FIFA World Cup qualification	Greece	1–1	Bosnia and Herzegovina	Piraeus, Greece
21:45 UTC+2	Tzavellas 90+5'	Report (FIFA); Report (UEFA)	Pjanić 32'	Stadium: Karaiskakis Stadium; Attendance: 20,075; Referee: Jonas Eriksson (Sweden)

=== 2017 ===
25 March 2017 2018 FIFA World Cup qualification	Belgium	1–1	Greece	Brussels, Belgium
20:45 UTC+1	Lukaku 89'	Report (FIFA); Report (UEFA)	Mitroglou 46'	Stadium: King Baudouin Stadium; Attendance: 42,281; Referee: Felix Brych (Germany)

9 June 2017 2018 FIFA World Cup qualification	Bosnia and Herzegovina	0–0	Greece	Zenica, Bosnia and Herzegovina
20:45 UTC+2		Report (FIFA); Report (UEFA)		Stadium: Bilino Polje Stadium; Attendance: 10,640; Referee: Nicola Rizzoli (Italy)

31 August 2017 2018 FIFA World Cup qualification	Greece	0−0	Estonia	Piraeus, Greece
21:45 UTC+3		Report (FIFA); Report (UEFA)		Stadium: Karaiskakis Stadium; Attendance: 12,379; Referee: Liran Liany (Israel)

3 September 2017 2018 FIFA World Cup qualification	Greece	1−2	Belgium	Piraeus, Greece
21:45 UTC+3	Zeca 73'	Report (FIFA); Report (UEFA)	Vertonghen 70'; Lukaku 74'	Stadium: Karaiskakis Stadium; Attendance: 29,465; Referee: Szymon Marciniak (Poland)

7 October 2017 2018 FIFA World Cup qualification	Cyprus	1−2	Greece	Nicosia, Cyprus
21:45 UTC+3	Sotiriou 18'	Report (FIFA); Report (UEFA)	Mitroglou 24'; Tziolis 26'	Stadium: GSP Stadium; Attendance: 7,222; Referee: Alberto Undiano Mallenco (Spain)

10 October 2017 2018 FIFA World Cup qualification	Greece	4–0	Gibraltar	Piraeus, Greece
21:45 UTC+3	Torosidis 32'; Mitroglou 61', 63'; Gianniotas 78'	Report (FIFA); Report (UEFA)		Stadium: Karaiskakis Stadium; Attendance: 12,739; Referee: Giorgi Kruashvili (Georgia)

9 November 2017 2018 FIFA World Cup qualification R2	Croatia	4–1	Greece	Zagreb, Croatia
20:45 UTC+2	Modrić 13' (pen.); N. Kalinić 19'; Perišić 33'; Kramarić 49'	Report (FIFA); Report (UEFA)	Papastathopoulos 30'	Stadium: Stadion Maksimir; Attendance: 30,013; Referee: Gianluca Rocchi (Italy)

12 November 2017 2018 FIFA World Cup qualification R2	Greece	0–0 (1–4 agg.)	Croatia	Piraeus, Greece
21:45 UTC+3		Report (FIFA)		Stadium: Karaiskakis Stadium; Attendance: 18,667; Referee: Björn Kuipers (Netherlands)

=== 2018 ===
23 March 2018 Friendly	Greece	0–1	Switzerland	Athens, Greece
20:00 UTC+1		Report	Džemaili 59'	Stadium: Olympic Stadium; Attendance: 5,487; Referee: Hugo Miguel (Portugal)

27 March 2018 Friendly	Greece	1–0	Egypt	Zürich, Switzerland
21:00 UTC+1	Karelis 29'	Report		Stadium: Letzigrund; Attendance: 2,000; Referee: Adrien Jaccottet (Switzerland)

15 May 2018 Friendly	Saudi Arabia	2–0	Greece	Seville, Spain
19:30 UTC+2	Al-Dawsari 19'; Kanno 79'	Report		Stadium: Estadio de La Cartuja; Attendance: 100; Referee: Carlos Del Cerro (Spain)

8 September 2018 2018–19 UEFA Nations League	Estonia	0–1	Greece	Tallinn, Estonia
21:45 UTC+3		Report	Fortounis 14'	Stadium: A. Le Coq Arena; Attendance: 5,567; Referee: Serdar Gözübüyük (Netherlands)

11 September 2018 2018–19 UEFA Nations League	Hungary	2–1	Greece	Budapest, Hungary
20:45 UTC+2	Sallai 15'; Kleinheisler 43'	Report	Manolas 18'	Stadium: Groupama Arena; Attendance: 0 (Note: The Hungary v Greece match was played behind closed doors due to a UEFA punishment against Hungary for racist behaviour in their UEFA Euro 2016 qualifying home match against Romania.); Referee: Aleksei Kulbakov (Belarus)

12 October 2018 2018–19 UEFA Nations League	Greece	1–0	Hungary	Athens, Greece
21:45 UTC+3	Mitroglou 65'	Report		Stadium: Olympic Stadium; Attendance: 7,000; Referee: Tobias Stieler (Germany)

15 October 2018 2018–19 UEFA Nations League	Finland	2–0	Greece	Tampere, Finland
21:45 UTC+3	Soiri 46'; Kamara 89'	Report		Stadium: Tampere Stadium; Attendance: 10,107; Referee: Paweł Gil (Poland)

15 November 2018 2018–19 UEFA Nations League	Greece	1–0	Finland	Athens, Greece
21:45 UTC+2	Granlund 25' (o.g.)	Report		Stadium: Olympic Stadium; Attendance: 6,376; Referee: Luca Banti (Italy)

18 November 2018 2018–19 UEFA Nations League	Greece	0–1	Estonia	Athens, Greece
21:45 UTC+2		Report	Lampropoulos 44' (o.g.)	Stadium: Olympic Stadium; Attendance: 5,179; Referee: Yevhen Aranovskyi (Ukraine)

=== 2019 ===
23 March 2019 UEFA Euro 2020 qualifying	Liechtenstein	0–2	Greece	Vaduz, Liechtenstein
20:45 UTC+2		Report	Fortounis 45+1'; Donis 80'	Stadium: Rheinpark Stadion; Attendance: 2,711; Referee: Alexandre Boucaut (Belgium)

26 March 2019 UEFA Euro 2020 qualifying	Bosnia and Herzegovina	2–2	Greece	Zenica, Bosnia and Herzegovina
20:45 UTC+2	Višća 10'; Pjanić 15'	Report	Fortounis 64' (pen.); Kolovos 85'	Stadium: Bilino Polje Stadium; Attendance: 10,500; Referee: Danny Makkelie (Netherlands)

30 May 2019 Friendly	Turkey	2–1	Greece	Antalya, Turkey
20:00 UTC+3	Ünder 11'; Karaman 17'	Report	Kourbelis 90+3'	Stadium: Antalya Stadium; Referee: Radu Petrescu (Romania)

8 June 2019 UEFA Euro 2020 qualifying	Greece	0–3	Italy	Athens, Greece
21:45 UTC+3		Report	Barella 23'; Insigne 30'; Bonucci 33'	Stadium: Olympic Stadium; Attendance: 19,828; Referee: Anthony Taylor (England)

11 June 2019 UEFA Euro 2020 qualifying	Greece	2–3	Armenia	Athens, Greece
21:45 UTC+3	Zeca 54'; Fortounis 87'	Report	Karapetian 8'; Ghazaryan 33'; Barseghyan 74'	Stadium: Olympic Stadium; Attendance: 7,011; Referee: Kristo Tohver (Estonia)

5 September 2019 UEFA Euro 2020 qualifying	Finland	1–0	Greece	Tampere, Finland
21:45 UTC+3	Pukki 52' (pen.)	Report		Stadium: Tampere Stadium; Attendance: 16,163; Referee: Juan Martínez Munuera (Spain)

8 September 2019 UEFA Euro 2020 qualifying	Greece	1–1	Liechtenstein	Athens, Greece
21:45 UTC+3	Masouras 33'	Report	Salanović 85'	Stadium: Olympic Stadium; Attendance: 3,445; Referee: Alexander Harkam (Austria)

12 October 2019 UEFA Euro 2020 qualifying	Italy	2–0	Greece	Rome, Italy
20:45 UTC+2	Jorginho 63' (pen.); Bernardeschi 78'	Report		Stadium: Stadio Olimpico; Attendance: 56,274; Referee: Sergei Karasev (Russia)

15 October 2019 UEFA Euro 2020 qualifying	Greece	2–1	Bosnia and Herzegovina	Athens, Greece
21:45 UTC+3	Pavlidis 30'; Kovačević 88' (o.g.)	Report	Gojak 35'	Stadium: Olympic Stadium; Attendance: 4,512; Referee: Felix Zwayer (Germany)

15 November 2019 UEFA Euro 2020 qualifying	Armenia	0–1	Greece	Yerevan, Armenia
21:00 UTC+4		Report	Limnios 35'	Stadium: Vazgen Sargsyan Republican Stadium; Attendance: 6,450; Referee: Paweł Raczkowski (Poland)

18 November 2019 UEFA Euro 2020 qualifying	Greece	2–1	Finland	Athens, Greece
21:45 UTC+2	Mantalos 47'; Galanopoulos 70'	Report	Pukki 27'	Stadium: Olympic Stadium; Attendance: 5,453; Referee: Aleksei Eskov (Russia)
