= Pepillo (footballer, born 1933) =

Spanish footballer

Pepillo II
Personal information
- Full name: José García Castro
- Date of birth: 10 July 1933
- Place of birth: Melilla, Spain
- Date of death: 10 May 2003 (aged 69)
- Place of death: Málaga, Spain

Senior career*
Years	Team	Apps	(Gls)
1953–1959	Sevilla FC	102	(42)
1959–1962	Real Madrid	22	(18)
1961	→ River Plate (loan)	18	(7)
1962–1963	Mallorca	26	(11)
1965–1966	Málaga	65	(7)
Total		233	(85)

International career
1955–1960	Spain B	9	(4)

Managerial career
- 1983–1984: UD Melilla
- * Club domestic league appearances and goals

José García Castro (10 July 1933 – 10 May 2003), also known as Pepillo, was a Spanish professional footballer. He played for Sevilla, Real Madrid, Mallorca, River Plate, and Málaga, as well as the Spanish B national team, between 1953 and 1966. He was sometimes nicknamed Pepillo II, to avoid confusion with former Sevilla player José Díaz Payán, who was also nicknamed Pepillo.

== Playing career ==
Pepilo II started his career as a striker in Sevilla's academy, making his debut in 1954 for the club. He scored 42 goals in 102 games for the club, before joining Real Madrid in 1959. He spent 4 years at Real Madrid, between 1959 and 1962. During the 1959-60 season, he scored 5 in a 11-2 win against Elche CF. In 1961, he went on loan to Argentine team River Plate, where he scored 7 goals in 18 games. He left Real Madrid to join Mallorca in 1962, where he scored 11 goals in his only season at the club. In 1965, he would join Malaga, where he scored 7 goals in 66 games, before retiring in 1966.

== Managerial career ==
He joined UD Melilla as their manager in 1983, lasting only 1 season.

== Honours ==
As Player:

Sevilla

- La Liga: 1956–57 (Runner-Up)
- Copa del Generalísimo: 1955 (Runner-Up)
- Ramón de Carranza Trophy: 1955, 1956, 1957
- Teresa Herrera Trophy: 1954

Real Madrid

- European Cup: 1959–60
- La Liga: 1961–62
- Copa del Rey: 1961–62
- Intercontinental Cup: 1960
