= Ramoní (footballer, born 1929) =

Spanish footballer

Personal information
- Date of birth: 6 February 1929
- Place of birth: Melilla, Spain
- Date of death: 6 January 2017 (aged 87)
- Position: Midfielder

Senior career*
Years	Team	Apps	(Gls)
1949–1958	Sevilla		
1958–1960	Granada		
1960–1962	CD Málaga		

International career
1952	Spain	2	(0)
- * Club domestic league appearances and goals

Ramón Martínez Pérez (6 February 1929 – 6 January 2017), also known as Ramoní, was a Spanish footballer. He played as a midfielder for Sevilla and Granada of La Liga. He also played for CD Málaga and made two appearances for the national team in 1952.

Martínez Pérez died on 6 January 2017 at the age of 87.
