= Greece national football team results (2020–present) =

This article provides details of international football games played by the Greece national football team from 2020 to present.

== Results ==
Key
Win
Draw
Defeat

=== 2020 ===
29 March 2020 Friendly	Mexico	Cancelled	Greece

28 May 2020 Friendly	Netherlands	Cancelled	Greece	Enschede, Netherlands

3 September 2020 2020–21 UEFA Nations League	Slovenia	0–0	Greece	Ljubljana, Slovenia
20:45 UTC+2		Report		Stadium: Stožice Stadium; Attendance: 0 (Note: Due to the COVID-19 pandemic in Europe, all matches scheduled for September 2020 were played behind closed doors.); Referee: Bobby Madden (Scotland)

6 September 2020 2020–21 UEFA Nations League	Kosovo	1–2	Greece	Pristina, Kosovo
20:45 UTC+2	B. Berisha 82'	Report	Limnios 2'; Siovas 51'	Stadium: Fadil Vokrri Stadium; Attendance: 0 Referee: Pavel Královec (Czech Republic)

7 October 2020 Friendly	Austria	2–1	Greece	Klagenfurt, Austria
20:30 UTC+2	Grbić 77'; Baumgartner 80'	Report	Fortounis 63'	Stadium: Wörthersee Stadion; Attendance: 0 (Note: Due to the COVID-19 pandemic in Europe, the match was played behind closed doors.); Referee: Matej Jug (Slovenia)

11 October 2020 2020–21 UEFA Nations League	Greece	2–0	Moldova	Athens, Greece
21:45 UTC+3	Bakasetas 45+3' (pen.); Mantalos 50'	Report		Stadium: Olympic Stadium; Attendance: 0 Referee: Dennis Higler (Netherlands)

14 October 2020 2020–21 UEFA Nations League	Greece	0–0	Kosovo	Athens, Greece
21:45 UTC+3		Report		Stadium: Olympic Stadium; Attendance: 0 Referee: Roi Reinshreiber (Israel)

11 November 2020 Friendly	Greece	2–1	Cyprus	Athens, Greece
16:45 UTC+2	Tzolis 8'; Giakoumakis 17'	Report	Elia 58'	Stadium: Georgios Kamaras Stadium; Attendance: 0 Referee: Harm Osmers (Germany)

15 November 2020 2020–21 UEFA Nations League	Moldova	0–2	Greece	Chișinău, Moldova
21:45 UTC+2		Report	Fortounis 32'; Bakasetas 41'	Stadium: Zimbru Stadium; Attendance: 0 Referee: Fran Jović (Croatia)

18 November 2020 2020–21 UEFA Nations League	Greece	0–0	Slovenia	Athens, Greece
21:45 UTC+2		Report		Stadium: Georgios Kamaras Stadium; Attendance: 0 Referee: Carlos del Cerro Grande (Spain)

=== 2021 ===
25 March 2021 2022 FIFA World Cup qualification	Spain	1–1	Greece	Granada, Spain
20:45 UTC+1	Morata 33'	Report	Bakasetas 57' (pen.)	Stadium: Nuevo Los Cármenes; Attendance: 0 Referee: Marco Guida (Italy)

28 March 2021 Friendly	Greece	2–1	Honduras	Thessaloniki, Greece
17:00 UTC+3	Pavlidis 14', 59'	Report	Rodríguez 41'	Stadium: Toumba Stadium; Attendance: 0 Referee: Urs Schnyder (Switzerland)

31 March 2021 2022 FIFA World Cup qualification	Greece	1–1	Georgia	Thessaloniki, Greece
21:45 UTC+3	Kakabadze 76' (o.g.)	Report	Kvaratskhelia 78'	Stadium: Toumba Stadium; Attendance: 0 Referee: Szymon Marciniak (Poland)

3 June 2021 Friendly	Belgium	1–1	Greece	Brussels, Belgium
20:45 UTC+2	Hazard 20'	Report	Tzavellas 66'	Stadium: King Baudouin Stadium; Attendance: 0 Referee: Robert Hennessy (Ireland)

6 June 2021 Friendly	Norway	1–2	Greece	Málaga, Spain
19:00 UTC+2	Strandberg 64'	Report	Masouras 13'; Androutsos 21'	Stadium: La Rosaleda; Attendance: 0 Referee: Jakob Kehlet (Denmark)

1 September 2021 Friendly	Switzerland	2–1	Greece	Basel, Switzerland
20:45 UTC+2	Zuber 7'; Vargas 51'	Report	Pavlidis 34'	Stadium: St. Jakob-Park; Attendance: 3,500; Referee: Antti Munukka (Finland)

5 September 2021 2022 FIFA World Cup qualification	Kosovo	1–1	Greece	Pristina, Kosovo
20:45 UTC+2	Muriqi 90+3'	Report	Douvikas 45+2'	Stadium: Fadil Vokrri Stadium; Attendance: 1,200; Referee: François Letexier (France)

8 September 2021 2022 FIFA World Cup qualification	Greece	2–1	Sweden	Athens, Greece
21:45 UTC+3	Bakasetas 62'; Pavlidis 78'	Report	Quaison 80'	Stadium: Olympic Stadium; Attendance: 3,475; Referee: Sergei Karasev (Russia)

9 October 2021 2022 FIFA World Cup qualification	Georgia	0–2	Greece	Batumi, Georgia
20:00 UTC+4		Report	Bakasetas 90' (pen.); Pelkas 90+5'	Stadium: Batumi Stadium; Attendance: 0 Referee: Donatas Rumšas (Lithuania)

12 October 2021 2022 FIFA World Cup qualification	Sweden	2–0	Greece	Solna, Sweden
20:45 UTC+2	Forsberg 59' (pen.); Isak 69'	Report		Stadium: Friends Arena; Attendance: 47,314; Referee: Tobias Stieler (Germany)

11 November 2021 2022 FIFA World Cup qualification	Greece	0–1	Spain	Athens, Greece
21:45 UTC+2		Report	Sarabia 26' (pen.)	Stadium: Olympic Stadium; Attendance: 7,825; Referee: Szymon Marciniak (Poland)

14 November 2021 2022 FIFA World Cup qualification	Greece	1–1	Kosovo	Athens, Greece
21:45 UTC+2	Masouras 44'	Report	Rrahmani 76'	Stadium: Olympic Stadium; Attendance: 1,388; Referee: Aleksei Kulbakov (Belarus)

=== 2022 ===
25 March 2022 Friendly	Romania	0–1	Greece	Bucharest, Romania
21:15 UTC+2		Report	Bouchalakis 39'	Stadium: Stadionul Steaua; Attendance: 20,000; Referee: Ricardo de Burgos Bengoetxea (Spain)

28 March 2022 Friendly	Montenegro	1–0	Greece	Podgorica, Montenegro
20:00 UTC+2	Osmajić 59'	Report		Stadium: Stadion Pod Goricom; Attendance: 3,425; Referee: Fran Jovic (Croatia)

2 June 2022 2022–23 UEFA Nations League	Northern Ireland	0–1	Greece	Belfast, Northern Ireland
19:45 UTC+1		Report	Bakasetas 39'	Stadium: Windsor Park; Attendance: 16,977; Referee: Erik Lambrechts (Belgium)

5 June 2022 2022–23 UEFA Nations League	Kosovo	0–1	Greece	Pristina, Kosovo
20:45 UTC+2		Report	Bakasetas 36'	Stadium: Fadil Vokrri Stadium; Attendance: 12,300; Referee: John Beaton (Scotland)

9 June 2022 2022–23 UEFA Nations League	Greece	3–0	Cyprus	Volos, Greece
21:45 UTC+3	Bakasetas 8'; Pavlidis 20'; Limnios 48'	Report		Stadium: Panthessaliko Stadium; Attendance: 12,418; Referee: Tamás Bognár (Hungary)

12 June 2022 2022–23 UEFA Nations League	Greece	2–0	Kosovo	Volos, Greece
21:45 UTC+3	Giakoumakis 71'; Mantalos 90+9'	Report		Stadium: Panthessaliko Stadium; Attendance: 15,367; Referee: Julian Weinberger (Austria)

24 September 2022 2022–23 UEFA Nations League	Cyprus	1–0	Greece	Larnaca, Cyprus
21:45 UTC+3	Tzionis 18'	Report		Stadium: AEK Arena – Georgios Karapatakis; Attendance: 4,548; Referee: Aleksei Kulbakov (Belarus)

27 September 2022 2022–23 UEFA Nations League	Greece	3–1	Northern Ireland	Athens, Greece
21:45 UTC+3	Pelkas 14'; Masouras 55'; Mantalos 80'	Report	Lavery 18'	Stadium: Georgios Kamaras Stadium; Attendance: 5,871; Referee: Filip Glova (Slovakia)

17 November 2022 Friendly	Malta	2–2	Greece	Ta' Qali, Malta
18:00 UTC+1	Degabriele 54'; Teuma 67' (pen.)	Report	Bakasetas 39'; Fountas 86'	Stadium: National Stadium; Attendance: 1,830; Referee: Alain Durieux (Luxembourg)

20 November 2022 Friendly	Hungary	2–1	Greece	Budapest, Hungary
20:15	Sallai 15'; Kalmár 90+3'	Report	Bakasetas 81' (pen.)	Stadium: Puskás Aréna; Attendance: 50,983; Referee: Daniele Chiffi (Italy)

=== 2023 ===
24 March 2023 UEFA Euro 2024 qualifying	Gibraltar	0–3	Greece	Faro/Loulé, Portugal
20:45		Report	Masouras 11'; Siopis 45'; Bakasetas 58'	Stadium: Estádio Algarve; Attendance: 390; Referee: Rohit Saggi (Norway)

27 March 2023 Friendly	Greece	0–0	Lithuania	Athens, Greece
18:00		Report		Stadium: Agia Sophia Stadium; Attendance: 11,950; Referee: Jonathan Lardot (Belgium)

16 June 2023 UEFA Euro 2024 qualifying	Greece	2–1	Republic of Ireland	Athens, Greece
21:45 UTC+3	Bakasetas 15' (pen.); Masouras 49'	Report	Collins 29'	Stadium: Agia Sophia Stadium; Attendance: 17,452; Referee: Harald Lechner (Austria)

19 June 2023 UEFA Euro 2024 qualifying	France	1–0	Greece	Saint-Denis, France
20:45	Mbappé 55' (pen.)	Report		Stadium: Stade de France; Attendance: 76,500; Referee: Antonio Mateu Lahoz (Spain)

7 September 2023 UEFA Euro 2024 qualifying	Netherlands	3–0	Greece	Eindhoven, Netherlands
20:45	De Roon 17'; Gakpo 31'; Weghorst 39'	Report		Stadium: Philips Stadion; Attendance: 32,079; Referee: Michael Oliver (England)

10 September 2023 UEFA Euro 2024 qualifying	Greece	5–0	Gibraltar	Athens, Greece
21:45 UTC+3	Pelkas 9'; Mavropanos 23', 82'; Masouras 70', 90+1'	Report		Stadium: Agia Sophia Stadium; Attendance: 9,774; Referee: Manfredas Lukjančukas (Lithuania)

13 October 2023 UEFA Euro 2024 qualifying	Republic of Ireland	0–2	Greece	Dublin, Ireland
19:45 UTC+1		Report	Giakoumakis 20'; Masouras 45+4'	Stadium: Aviva Stadium; Attendance: 41,239; Referee: Glenn Nyberg (Sweden)

16 October 2023 UEFA Euro 2024 qualifying	Greece	0–1	Netherlands	Athens, Greece
21:45 UTC+3		Report	Van Dijk 90+3' (pen.)	Stadium: Agia Sophia Stadium; Attendance: 24,967; Referee: Alejandro Hernández Hernández (Spain)

17 November 2023 Friendly	Greece	2–0	New Zealand	Athens, Greece
19:00	Konstantelias 10'; Giakoumakis 29'	Report		Stadium: Georgios Kamaras Stadium; Attendance: 5,625; Referee: Luca Cibelli (Switzerland)

21 November 2023 UEFA Euro 2024 qualifying	Greece	2–2	France	Athens, Greece
21:45 UTC+2	Bakasetas 56'; Ioannidis 61'	Report	Kolo Muani 42'; Fofana 74'	Stadium: Agia Sophia Stadium; Attendance: 24,820; Referee: Daniel Siebert (Germany)

=== 2024 ===
21 March 2024 UEFA Euro 2024 qualifying play-offs	Greece	5–0	Kazakhstan	Athens, Greece
21:45 UTC+2	Bakasetas 9' (pen.); Pelkas 15'; Ioannidis 37'; Kourbelis 40'; Tapalov 86' (o.g.)	Report		Stadium: Agia Sophia Stadium; Attendance: 25,200; Referee: Danny Makkelie (Netherlands)

26 March 2024 UEFA Euro 2024 qualifying play-offs	Georgia	0–0 (4–2 p)	Greece	Tbilisi, Georgia
21:00 UTC+4		Report		Stadium: Boris Paichadze Dinamo Arena; Attendance: 44,000; Referee: Szymon Marciniak (Poland)
	Penalties
	Kochorashvili (penalty scored); Davitashvili (penalty scored); Mikautadze (penalty missed); Dvali (penalty scored); Kvekveskiri (penalty scored)		(penalty missed) Bakasetas; (penalty scored) Masouras; (penalty scored) Bouchalakis; (penalty missed) Giakoumakis

7 June 2024 Friendly	Germany	2–1	Greece	Mönchengladbach, Germany
21:45 UTC+2	Havertz 56'; Groß 89'	Report	Masouras 33'	Stadium: Borussia-Park; Attendance: 45,500; Referee: José Luis Munuera Montero (Spain)

11 June 2024 Friendly	Malta	0–2	Greece	Grödig, Austria
19:00 UTC+2		Report	Bakasetas 7' (pen.); Tzolis 15'	Stadium: Untersberg-Arena; Attendance: 500; Referee: Alan Kijas (Austria)

7 September 2024 2024–25 UEFA Nations League	Greece	3–0	Finland	Piraeus, Greece
21:45 UTC+3	Ioannidis 23', 76'; Källman 37' (o.g.)	Report		Stadium: Karaiskakis Stadium; Attendance: 17,293; Referee: Urs Schnyder (Switzerland)

10 September 2024 2024–25 UEFA Nations League	Republic of Ireland	0–2	Greece	Dublin, Ireland
19:45 UTC+1		Report	Ioannidis 50'; Tzolis 87'	Stadium: Aviva Stadium; Attendance: 37,274; Referee: Espen Eskås (Norway)

10 October 2024 2024–25 UEFA Nations League	England	1–2	Greece	London, England
19:45 UTC+1	Bellingham 87'	Report	Pavlidis 49', 90+4'	Stadium: Wembley Stadium; Attendance: 79,012; Referee: Andrea Colombo (Italy)

13 October 2024 2024–25 UEFA Nations League	Greece	2–0	Republic of Ireland	Piraeus, Greece
21:45 UTC+3	Bakasetas 48'; Mantalos 90+1'	Report		Stadium: Karaiskakis Stadium; Attendance: 41,239; Referee: Joey Kooij (Netherlands)

14 November 2024 2024–25 UEFA Nations League	Greece	0–3	England	Athens, Greece
21:45 UTC+3		Report	Watkins 7'; Vlachodimos 77' (o.g.); Jones 83'	Stadium: Olympic Stadium; Attendance: 60,664; Referee: Daniel Siebert (Germany)

17 November 2024 2024–25 UEFA Nations League	Finland	0–2	Greece	Helsinki, Finland
19:00 UTC+2		Report	Bakasetas 52'; Tzolis 56'	Stadium: Helsinki Olympic Stadium; Attendance: 17,661; Referee: Willy Delajod (France)

=== 2025 ===
20 March 2025 2024–25 UEFA Nations League promotion play-offs	Greece	0–1	Scotland	Piraeus, Greece
21:45 UTC+2		Report	McTominay 33' (pen.)	Stadium: Karaiskakis Stadium; Attendance: 31,483; Referee: Tobias Stieler (Germany)

23 March 2025 2024–25 UEFA Nations League promotion play-offs	Scotland	0–3 (1–3 agg.)	Greece	Glasgow, Scotland
17:00 UTC+0		Report	Konstantelias 20'; Karetsas 42'; Tzolis 46'	Stadium: Hampden Park; Attendance: 48,626; Referee: Davide Massa (Italy)
Note: Greece won – on aggregate and were promoted to League A, while Scotland were relegated to League B.

7 June 2025 Friendly	Greece	4–1	Slovakia	Heraklion, Greece
21:45 UTC+3	Konstantelias 16'; Pavlidis 66'; Douvikas 88'; Hrnčár 90+2' (o.g.)		Hancko 34'	Stadium: Pankritio Stadium; Attendance: 18,930; Referee: Harm Osmers (Germany)

10 June 2025 Friendly	Greece	4–0	Bulgaria	Heraklion, Greece
21:45 UTC+3	Pelkas 51'; Ioannidis 66'; Tzolis 74'; Konstantelias 89'	Report		Stadium: Pankritio Stadium; Attendance: 18,000; Referee: Nathan Verboomen (Belgium)

5 September 2025 2026 FIFA World Cup qualification	Greece	5–1	Belarus	Piraeus, Greece
21:45 UTC+3	Karetsas 3'; Pavlidis 17'; Bakasetas 21'; Kourbelis 36'; Tzolis 63'	Report	Barkouski 72' (pen.)	Stadium: Karaiskakis Stadium; Attendance: 14,936; Referee: Jarred Gillett (England / Australia)

8 September 2025 2026 FIFA World Cup qualification	Greece	0–3	Denmark	Piraeus, Greece
21:45 UTC+3		Report	Damsgaard 32'; Christensen 62'; Højlund 81'	Stadium: Karaiskakis Stadium; Attendance: 31,172; Referee: Donatas Rumšas (Lithuania)

9 October 2025 2026 FIFA World Cup qualification	Scotland	3–1	Greece	Glasgow, Scotland
19:45 UTC+1	Christie 64'; Ferguson 80'; Dykes 90+3'	Report	Tsimikas 62'	Stadium: Hampden Park; Attendance: 46,006; Referee: Espen Eskås (Norway)

12 October 2025 2026 FIFA World Cup qualification	Denmark	3–1	Greece	Copenhagen, Denmark
20:45 UTC+2	Højlund 21'; Andersen 40'; Damsgaard 41'	Report	Tzolis 63'	Stadium: Parken Stadium; Attendance: 35,623; Referee: Michael Oliver (England)

15 November 2025 2026 FIFA World Cup qualification	Greece	3–2	Scotland	Piraeus, Greece
21:45 UTC+2	Bakasetas 7'; Karetsas 57'; Tzolis 63'	Report	Gannon-Doak 65'; Christie 70'	Stadium: Karaiskakis Stadium; Attendance: 18,405; Referee: Jesús Gil Manzano (Spain)

18 November 2025 2026 FIFA World Cup qualification	Belarus	0–0	Greece	Zalaegerszeg, Hungary (Note: Due to the Belarusian involvement in the Russian invasion of Ukraine, Belarus are required to play their home matches at neutral venues and behind closed doors.)
20:45 UTC+1		Report		Stadium: ZTE Arena; Attendance: 0 Referee: Damian Sylwestrzak (Poland)

=== 2026 ===
27 March 2026 Friendly	Greece	0–1	Paraguay	Piraeus, Greece
21:00 UTC+2		Report	Gómez 52'	Stadium: Karaiskakis Stadium; Attendance: 10,000; Referee: Danielle Chiffi (Italy)

31 March 2026 Friendly	Hungary	0–0	Greece	Budapest, Hungary
19:00 UTC+2		Report		Stadium: Puskás Aréna; Attendance: 54,849; Referee: Florian Badstübner (Germany)

4 June 2026 Friendly	Sweden	2–2	Greece	Solna, Sweden
19:00 UTC+2	Gyökeres 53'; Nilsson 69'	Report	Tsimikas 10'; Masouras 90+5'	Stadium: Nationalarenan; Attendance: 39,139; Referee: Aaron Wyn Jones (Wales)

7 June 2026 Friendly	Greece	0–1	Italy	Heraklion, Greece
21:00		Report	Esposito 18'	Stadium: Pankritio Stadium; Attendance: 13,000; Referee: Yigal Frid (Israel)

24 September 2026 2026–27 UEFA Nations League	Serbia	1–2	Greece	Belgrade, Serbia
20:45 CEST (UTC+2)	Živković 4'	Report	Tzolis 74'; Douvikas 90+5'	Stadium: Rajko Mitić Stadium; Attendance: 5,701; Referee: Glenn Nyberg (Sweden)

27 September 2026 2026–27 UEFA Nations League	Germany	0–1	Greece	Augsburg, Germany
20:45 CEST (UTC+2)		Report	Kourbelis 74'	Stadium: Augsburg Arena; Attendance: 28,945; Referee: Chris Kavanagh (England)

1 October 2026 2026–27 UEFA Nations League	Greece	2–2	Netherlands	Thessaloniki, Greece
21:45 EEST (UTC+3)	Ioannidis 23'; Masouras 45+2'	Report	Van Dijk 59'; Reijnders 89'	Stadium: Toumba Stadium; Attendance: 26,538; Referee: Marco Guida (Italy)

4 October 2026 2026–27 UEFA Nations League	Greece	0–0	Germany	Thessaloniki, Greece
21:45 EEST (UTC+3)		Report		Stadium: Toumba Stadium; Attendance: 27,599; Referee: Clément Turpin (France)

13 November 2026 2026–27 UEFA Nations League	Netherlands	7–0	Greece	Amsterdam, Netherlands
20:45 CET (UTC+1)	Summerville 6'; Reijnders 12', 18', 33'; Timber 40', 59'; Malen 61'	Report		Stadium: Johan Cruyff Arena; Attendance: 51,221; Referee: Rohit Saggi (Norway)

16 November 2026 2026–27 UEFA Nations League	Greece	1–0	Serbia	Volos, Greece
21:45 EET (UTC+2)	Masouras 69'	Report		Stadium: Panthessaliko Stadium; Attendance: 20,960; Referee: Michael Oliver (England)

== Head to head records ==
Head to head records
Opponent	P	W	D	L	GF	GA	W%	D%	L%
Austria	1	0	0	1	1	2	0	0	100
Belarus	2	1	1	0	5	1	50	50	0
Belgium	1	0	1	0	1	1	0	100	0
Bulgaria	1	1	0	0	4	0	100	0	0
Cyprus	3	2	0	1	5	2	66.67	0	33.33
Denmark	2	0	0	2	1	6	0	0	100
England	2	1	0	1	2	4	50	0	50
Finland	2	2	0	0	5	0	100	0	0
France	2	0	1	1	2	3	0	50	50
Georgia	3	1	2	0	3	1	33.33	66.67	0
Germany	3	1	1	1	2	2	33.33	33.33	33.33
Gibraltar	2	2	0	0	8	0	100	0	0
Honduras	1	1	0	0	2	1	100	0	0
Hungary	2	0	1	1	1	2	0	50	50
Italy	1	0	0	1	0	1	0	0	100
Kazakhstan	1	1	0	0	5	0	100	0	0
Kosovo	6	3	3	0	7	3	50	50	0
Lithuania	1	0	1	0	0	0	0	100	0
Malta	2	1	1	0	4	2	50	50	0
Moldova	2	2	0	0	4	0	100	0	0
Montenegro	1	0	0	1	0	1	0	0	100
Netherlands	4	0	1	3	2	13	0	25	75
New Zealand	1	1	0	0	2	0	100	0	0
Northern Ireland	2	2	0	0	4	1	100	0	0
Norway	1	1	0	0	2	1	100	0	0
Paraguay	1	0	0	1	0	1	0	0	100
Republic of Ireland	4	4	0	0	8	1	100	0	0
Romania	1	1	0	0	1	0	100	0	0
Scotland	4	2	0	2	7	6	50	0	50
Serbia	2	2	0	0	3	1	100	0	0
Slovakia	1	1	0	0	4	1	100	0	0
Slovenia	2	0	2	0	0	0	0	100	0
Spain	2	0	1	1	1	2	0	50	50
Sweden	3	1	1	1	4	5	33.33	33.33	33.33
Switzerland	1	0	0	1	1	2	0	0	100
Totals	70	34	17	19	101	66	48.57	24.29	27.14
