= Antoine Dalla Cieca =

French footballer (1931–2022)

Personal information
- Date of birth: 15 November 1931
- Place of birth: Champigny-sur-Marne, France
- Date of death: 27 January 2022 (aged 90)
- Height: 1.76 m (5 ft 9 in)
- Position: Midfielder

Senior career*
Years	Team	Apps	(Gls)
1953–1958	RC Paris	152	(30)
1958–1960	Lyon	63	(12)
1960–1963	Rouen	110	(30)
1963–1964	Angers	22	(7)
1964–1966	Red Star	48	(9)
1966–1967	VS Chartres		
Total		395	(88)

Managerial career
- 1966–1969: VS Chartres
- 1969–1972: CA Montreuil
- 1972–1978: Paris FC
- 1978–1981: Red Star
- * Club domestic league appearances and goals

Antoine Dalla Cieca (15 November 1931 – 27 January 2022) was a French football player and manager who played as a midfielder.

== Biography ==
As a young footballer, Cieca played in his hometown of Champigny-sur-Marne. From 1953 to 1958, he played for RC Paris. He then played for Lyon from 1958 to 1960, where he scored 12 goals and played in the 1958–60 Inter-Cities Fairs Cup. He played for Rouen from 1960 to 1963 before playing a season with Angers. He ended his professional career with Red Star in 1966, spending the following season with VS Chartres. In total, he played in 395 games and scored 88 goals.

Cieca remained coach of VS Chartres until 1969, when he began managing CA Montreuil. He ended his coaching career in 1981 with Red Star after the team was relegated to Division 4.

He died on 27 January 2022, at the age of 90.
