= Bülent Esel =

Turkish footballer

Personal information
- Full name: Bülent Aziz Esel
- Date of birth: 23 July 1927
- Place of birth: İzmir, Turkey
- Date of death: 17 August 2004 (aged 77)
- Place of death: İzmir, Turkey
- Height: 1.71 m (5 ft 7 in)
- Position: Forward

Youth career
- –: Kırıkkalespor

Senior career*
| Years | Team | Apps | (Gls) |
| –1943 | Kırıkkalespor | | |
| 1943–1948 | Ankaragücü | | |
| 1948–1950 | Beşiktaş | 26 | (25) |
| 1950–1951 | Adaletspor | | |
| 1951–1954 | SPAL | 78 | (25) |
| 1954–1957 | Beşiktaş | 24 | (10) |
| 1957–1958 | Vefa | 18 | (5) |
| 1958–1964 | Altınordu | 123 | (24) |

International career
| 1949–1950 | Turkey | 4 | (3) |
- * Club domestic league appearances and goals

Bülent Esel (23 July 1927 – 17 August 2004) was a Turkey international football forward who played for clubs in Turkey and Italy.

== Career ==
Born in İzmir, Esel began playing youth football for Kırıkkalespor. He played senior football for Kırıkkalespor and Ankaragücü before moving to Italy in 1951, where he would make 78 appearances and scored 25 goals during three seasons in Serie A for SPAL 1907.

Esel returned to Turkey and spent the remainder of his career with Beşiktaş J.K., Vefa S.K. and Altınordu S.K.

Esel made four appearances for the Turkey national football team from 1949 to 1950.

== Personal ==
Esel died on 17 August 2004.
