= Italy national football B team =

B team representing the Italian Football Federation

Italy B
- Nickname: Gli Azzurri (The Blues)
- Association: Italian Football Federation (Federazione Italiana Giuoco Calcio – FIGC)
- Head coach: Vacant
- Home stadium: N/A

First international
- Luxembourg 1–5 Italy (Esch-sur-Alzette, Luxembourg; 17 April 1927)

Biggest win
- Italy 12–0 Luxembourg (Como, Italy; 10 April 1932)

Biggest defeat
- Bulgaria 5–1 Italy (Sofia, Bulgaria; 7 November 1963)

The Italy national football B team is a B team representing the Italian Football Federation. Over time, the squad has faced other nations' full teams and played matches against 'B' teams from other football associations. Since the team's creation in 1927, they have played 70 official matches.

== History ==
Italy B was created in 1927, to give the possibility to test under-21 or less experienced players, in addition to those involved with the senior national team. made their debut at the Stade de la Frontière in Esch-sur-Alzette on 17 April 1927, beating Luxembourg's A team 5-1. The selector of the team was Renzo De Vecchi. The team also had elements of some experience, such as Luigi Cevenini, the author of the first goal.

Until the Second World War the use of this national team was very frequent, so much so that between 1929 and 1939, a total of 38 matches were played, the most notable of which being the team's biggest ever victory, when they again beat Luxembourg A, 12-0, at the Stadio Giuseppe Sinigaglia in Como, on 10 April 1932.

Their first meeting after the war was a match played in Locarno on 11 November 1945 by a team from northern Italy, which beat Switzerland B 4-1. In May 1949, Italy B participated in the 1949 Eastern Mediterranean Friendship Cup (or Mediterranean Cup), playing three matches in Athens against Turkey A, Egypt A and Greece A, and they won all three games by a 1 goal margin, thus winning the tournament. Italy's top goal scorers in the tournament were Aldo Puccinelli and Alberto Galassi with 3 goals each. They then participated in the following tournament of the Mediterranean Cup, where they faced the A teams of Turkey, Egypt and Greece home and away, and Italy B again won with 3 wins, 2 draws and 1 defeat, with their only loss in the tournament being a 3-0 shock defeat to Egypt at Prince Farouk Stadium, Cairo on 11 November 1951. Italy B also participated in the third and last edition of the Mediterranean Cup, the 1953-58 Mediterranean Cup, with the B teams of Spain and France joining the party to form a six-team tournament, and this time they finished third behind the aforementioned B teams with 3 wins, 3 draws and 4 losses.

The most recent fixture was a non-A friendly with San Marino on 31 May 2017, which ended in an 8-0 win to the Azzurri.

== Honours ==
Eastern Mediterranean Friendship Cup Champion: 1949
Eastern Mediterranean Cup Champion: 1950-53

== See also ==
- Italy national football team
