= Vangelis Panakis =

Greek footballer

Personal information
- Full name: Evangelos Panakis
- Date of birth: 8 June 1933
- Place of birth: Athens, Greece
- Date of death: 23 January 2017 (aged 83)
- Place of death: Athens, Greece
- Position: Forward

Youth career
- –1951: PAO Kalogreza

Senior career*
Years	Team	Apps	(Gls)
1951–1965	Panathinaikos	91	(57)
Total		91	(57)

International career
1954–1962	Greece	14	(5)

Managerial career
- 1974: Acharnaikos
- 1975: Panathinaikos
- 1975–1976: Atromitos
- * Club domestic league appearances and goals

Vangelis Panakis (Greek: Βαγγέλης Πανάκης; 8 June 1933 – 23 January 2017) was a Greek professional footballer who played as a forward for Panathinaikos and a later manager. His real name was Panopoulos. He played in 14 matches for the Greece national football team from 1954 to 1962. He was also part of Greece's team for their qualification matches for the 1954 FIFA World Cup.

== Honours ==
Panathinaikos

- Alpha Ethniki: 1952–53, 1959–60, 1960–61, 1961–62, 1963–64, 1964–65
- Greek Cup: 1954–55
- Athens FCA Championship: 1951–52, 1952–53, 1953–54, 1954–55, 1955–56, 1956–57, 1958–59

== See also ==
- List of one-club men in association football
