= Bulgaria national football team results (1924–1959) =

This article provides details of international football games played by the Bulgaria national football team from 1924 to 1959.

During this period, they only competed in one major tournament, the 1956 Summer Olympics in Melbourne, in which they claimed the bronze medal after beating India. They also played the inaugural edition of the Baltic Cup in 1929–31, winning the tournament in 1931 and 1932).

== Results ==
=== 1920s ===
==== 1924 ====
| 21 May Friendly | Austria | 6–0 | Bulgaria | Vienna, Austria |
| | Horvath 31', 48', 49'; Grünwald 45', 49'; Danis 73' | | | Stadium: Simmeringer Had; Attendance: 10,000; Referee: Tivadar Kiss (Hungary) |

| 28 May 1924 Olympics second round | Irish Free State | 1–0 | Bulgaria | Colombes, France |
| | Duncan 75' | Report | | Stadium: Stade Olympique; Attendance: 1,659; Referee: Henri Henriot (France) |

==== 1925 ====
| 10 April Friendly | Turkey | 2–1 | Bulgaria | Istanbul, Turkey |
| | Leblebi 31'; Arca 67' | Report | 74' Mutafchiev | Stadium: Taksim Stadium; Attendance: 4,000; Referee: W. H. Allen (England) |

| 31 May Friendly | Bulgaria | 2–4 | Romania | Sofia, Bulgaria |
| | Ivanov 4'; Dimitriev 89' | Report | 14', 65' Wetzer; 60', 81' (pen.) Semler | Stadium: Yunak Stadium; Attendance: 10,000; Referee: Umberto Marca (Italy) |

==== 1926 ====
| 25 April Friendly | Romania | 6–1 | Bulgaria | Bucharest, Romania |
| | Guga 17'; Kugelbauer 24', 44'; Nagy-Csomag 55'; Ströck 62' (pen.); Avar 80' | report | 70' Denev | Stadium: Stadionul Romcomit; Attendance: 12,000; Referee: Albert Rolton (England) |

| 30 May Friendly | Yugoslavia | 3–1 | Bulgaria | Zagreb, Yugoslavia |
| | Cindrić 75', 83', 87' | Report | Staykov 23' | Stadium: Maksimir Stadium; Attendance: 6,000; Referee: Gyorgy Gerő (Hungary) |

==== 1927 ====
| 15 May Friendly | Bulgaria | 0–2 | Yugoslavia | Sofia, Bulgaria |
| 17:30 (UTC+2:00) | | Report | Marjanović 85', 88' | Stadium: Old Slavia Stadium; Attendance: 16,000; Referee: Vasile Nicolaeviciu (Romania) |

| 17 July Friendly | Bulgaria | 3–3 | Turkey | Sofia, Bulgaria |
| | Liutskanov 37', 66'; Stoyanov 83' | Report | 2', 5' Yalınlı; 75' Faruki | Stadium: Slavia Stadium; Attendance: 10,000; Referee: Ede Vicenik (Hungary) |

| 14 October Friendly | Turkey | 3 – 1 | Bulgaria | Istanbul, Turkey |
| | Sporel 25', 65'; Bekdik 85' | report | 72' Manolov | Stadium: Taksim Stadium; Attendance: 8,000; Referee: Vasile Nicolaeviciu (Romania) |

==== 1929 ====
| 21 April Friendly | Romania | 3–0 | Bulgaria | Bucharest, Romania |
| | Ciolac 64', 71', 73' | report | | Stadium: Stadionul ONEF; Attendance: 10,000; Referee: Mihály Ivanicsics (Hungary) |

| 30 June Friendly | Bulgaria | 1–1 | Greece | Sofia, Bulgaria |
| 18:00 | Staykov 63' (pen.) | Report | G. Andrianopoulos 15' | Stadium: Levski Field; Attendance: 12,000; Referee: Ernest Fabris (Yugoslavia) |

| 22 August Friendly | Hungary | 3–2 | Bulgaria | Budapest, Hungary |
| | ? | Report | Staykov 78', 85' | Attendance: 6,000; Referee: Ágoston Csárdás (Hungary) |

| 15 September Friendly | Bulgaria | 2–3 | Romania | Sofia, Bulgaria |
| | Staykov 37', 60' | report | 30' Sepi; 61' Kovács; 67' Deșu | Stadium: Levski Field; Attendance: 15,000; Referee: Ferenc Gerő (Hungary) |

=== 1930s ===
==== 1930 ====
| 13 April 1929–31 Balkan Cup | Yugoslavia | 6–1 | Bulgaria | Sofia, Bulgaria |
| 16:00 (+1:00) | Vujadinović 2', 81'; Marjanović 22', 80'; Tirnanić 57'; Hrnjiček 89' | Report | Staykov 35' | Stadium: Old Slavia Stadium; Attendance: 8,000; Referee: Sándor Bíró |

| 15 June Friendly | Bulgaria | 2–2 | Yugoslavia | Sofia, Bulgaria |
| | Stoyanov 16'; Staykov 74' | Report | Tirnanić 57'; Najdanović 87' | Stadium: Levski Field; Attendance: 15,000; Referee: Sándor Bíró (Hungary) |

| 5 August Friendly | Bulgaria | 0–2 | Hungary | Sofia, Bulgaria |
| | | Report | | Stadium: Levski Field; Attendance: 5,000; Referee: Ivan Batandzhiev (Bulgaria) |

| 12 October 1929-31 Balkan Cup | Bulgaria | 5–3 | Romania | Sofia, Belgium |
| | Staykov 11' (pen.), 52'; Stoyanov 34'; Peshev 47'; Vasilev 50' | report | 23', 43' Wetzer; 71' (o.g.) Vasilev | Stadium: Slavia Stadium; Attendance: 10,000; Referee: Jovan Ružić (Yugoslavia) |

| 16 November 1929–31 Balkan Cup | Bulgaria | 0–3 | Yugoslavia | Sofia, Bulgaria |
| 15:00 (+2:00) | | Report | Lemešić 7'; Marjanović 27'; Praunsperger 78' | Stadium: Old Slavia Stadium; Referee: Jovan Ružić (Yugoslavia) |

| 7 December 1929–31 Balkan Cup | Greece | 6–1 | Bulgaria | Athens, Greece |
| 15:00 (+2:00) | Tsolinas 4', 50', 51', 60'; Messaris 10', 15' | Report | Peshev 56' | Stadium: Leoforos Alexandras Stadium; Attendance: 15,000; Referee: Jovan Ružić (Yugoslavia) |

==== 1931 ====
| 19 April 1929–31 Balkan Cup | Yugoslavia | 1–0 | Bulgaria | Belgrade, Yugoslavia |
| 16:15 (+1:00) | Marjanović 21' | Report | | Stadium: Beogradski SK Stadium; Attendance: 8,000; Referee: Ernest Fabris (Yugoslavia) |

| 10 May 1929-31 Balkan Cup | Romania | 5–2 | Bulgaria | Bucharest, Romania |
| | Sepi 25'; Bodola 50', 66'; Stanciu 68', 81' | report | 51' Lozanov; 89' Panchev | Stadium: Stadionul ONEF; Attendance: 12,000; Referee: Josip Fabris (Yugoslavia) |

| 17 May Friendly | Bulgaria | 2–2 | Italy | Sofia, Bulgaria |
| 17:00 CET (UTC+02:00) | Lozanov 36'; Stoyanov 65' | Report | | Stadium: Yunak Stadium; Attendance: 20,000; Referee: Mihály Iváncsics (Hungary) |

| 25 October 1929–31 Balkan Cup | Bulgaria | 2–1 | Greece | Sofia, Bulgaria |
| 15:30 | Peshev 20'; Angelov 83' | Report | Kitsos 10' | Stadium: Yunak Stadium; Attendance: 10,000; Referee: Jovan Ružić (Yugoslavia) |

| 27 September 1931 Balkan C | Bulgaria | 5 – 1 | Turkey | Sofia, Bulgaria |
| | Lozanov 4'; Panchev 50', 76', 80'; Stoyanov 50' | Report | 31' Yeten | Stadium: Vasil Levski Stadium; Attendance: 10,000; Referee: Mihály Ivanicsics (Hungary) |

| 4 October 1931 Balkan Cup | Bulgaria | 3–2 | Yugoslavia | Sofia, Bulgaria |
| | Lozanov 50'; Angelov 56'; Panchev 86' | Report | Tirnanić 3'; Marjanović 20' | Stadium: Yunak Stadium; Attendance: 15,000; Referee: Mihály Iváncsics (Hungary) |

==== 1932 ====
| 20 March Friendly | Italy | 4–0 | Bulgaria | Padua, Italy |
| 15:00 CET (UTC+01:00) | | Report | | Stadium: Stadio Silvio Appiani; Attendance: 12,000; Referee: Ferenc Kann (Hungary) |

| 27 March Friendly | Greece | 1–2 | Bulgaria | Athens, Greece |
| 15:30 | Simeonidis 33' | Report | Panchev 50'; Angelov 71' | Stadium: Leoforos Alexandras Stadium; Attendance: 15,000; Referee: Ernest Fabris (Yugoslavia) |

| 24 April Friendly | Bulgaria | 1–1 | Hungary | Sofia, Bulgaria |
| | | Report | | Stadium: Yunak Stadium; Attendance: 10,000; Referee: Nikola Ninov (Bulgaria) |

| 9 June Friendly | Bulgaria | 3–5 | France | Sofia, Bulgaria |
| | Panchev 51', 63', 86' (pen.) | Report1; Report2 | Rodriguez 1'; Sécember 6', 16', 28', 47' | Stadium: Yunak Stadium; Attendance: 6,000; Referee: Josip Fabris (Yugoslavia) |

| 26 June 1932 Balkan Cup | Bulgaria | 2–0 | Romania | Belgrade, Yugoslavia |
| | Peshev 65', 89' | Report | | Stadium: Stadion Beogradski SK; Attendance: 5,000; Referee: Mika Popović (Yugoslavia) |

| 30 June 1932 Balkan Cup | Yugoslavia | 2–3 | Bulgaria | Belgrade, Yugoslavia |
| 17:30 (+1:00) | Živković 84', 89' | Report | Angelov 35'; Peshev 47'; Lozanov 84' | Stadium: Beogradski SK Stadium; Attendance: 6,000; Referee: Stavros Hatzopoulos (Greece) |

| 2 July 1932 Balkan Cup | Bulgaria | 2–0 | Greece | Belgrade, Yugoslavia |
| 17:30 | Angelov 71'; Peshev 85' (pen.) | Report | | Stadium: Beogradski SK Stadium; Attendance: 3,500; Referee: Radu Istrate (Romania) |

| 4 November Friendly | Turkey | 2 – 3 | Bulgaria | Istanbul, Turkey |
| | Bilgiç 6'; Almay 52' | report | 55' Staykov; 63'Peshev; 81' Angelov | Stadium: Taksim Stadium; Attendance: 5,000; Referee: Bora Vasiliević (Yugoslavia) |

==== 1933 ====
| 21 May Friendly | Spain | 13–0 | Bulgaria | Madrid, Spain |
| 17:00 (UTC) | Chacho 6', 9', 21', 68', 77', 87'; Regueiro 29', 76'; Elícegui 40', 42', 59'; Mishtalov 46' (o.g.); Bosch 85' | Report | | Stadium: Chamartín; Attendance: 60,000; Referee: António Palhinhas (Portugal) |
Note: The heaviest defeat of the Bulgaria football team

| 4 June 1933 Balkan Cup | Romania | 7 – 0 | Bulgaria | Bucharest, Romania |
| | Vâlcov 11', 76'; Dobay 53', 62'; Ciolac 57', 61', 66' | Report | | Stadium: Stadionul ONEF; Attendance: 15,000; Referee: Stavros Hatzopoulos (Greece) |

| 7 June 1933 Balkan Cup | Yugoslavia | 4–0 | Bulgaria | Bucharest, Romania |
| | Kokotović 10', 54', 75'; Živković 22' | Report | | Stadium: Stadionul ONEF; Attendance: 5,000; Referee: Stavros Hatzopoulos (Greece) |

| 10 June 1933 Balkan Cup | Bulgaria | 2–0 | Greece | Bucharest, Romania |
| | Todorov 85', 88' | Report | | Stadium: Stadionul ONEF; Attendance: 8,000; Referee: Constantin Rădulescu (Romania) |

==== 1934 ====
| 4 February Friendly | Greece | 1–0 | Bulgaria | Athens, Greece |
| 15:00 | Danelian 30' | Report | | Stadium: Leoforos Alexandras Stadium; Attendance: 10,000; Referee: Stavros Hatzopoulos (Greece) |

| 18 March Friendly | Bulgaria | 1–2 | Yugoslavia | Sofia, Bulgaria |
| | Angelov 66' | Report | Marjanović 8', 30' | Stadium: Athletic Park; Attendance: 6,500; Referee: Nikola Dosev (Bulgaria) |

| 25 March 1934 FIFA World Cup qualification | Bulgaria | 1–4 | Hungary | Sofia, Bulgaria |
| | Baikushev 27' | Report | Sárosi 29'; Szabó 61' (pen.); Toldi 88'; Markos 89' | Stadium: A.S. 23 Stadium; Attendance: 10,000; Referee: Denis Xifando (Romania) |

| 1 April Friendly | Yugoslavia | 2–3 | Bulgaria | Belgrade, Yugoslavia |
| 16:00 (+1:00) | Kragić 74'; Živković 75' | Report | Angelov 63'; Baikutchev 82', 86' | Stadium: Beogradski SK Stadium; Attendance: 8,000; Referee: Mika Popovic (Yugoslavia) |

| 25 April 1934 FIFA World Cup qualification | Austria | 6–1 | Bulgaria | Vienna, Austria |
| | Horvath 19', 22', 33'; Zischek 59'; Viertl 62'; Sindelar 67' | | Lozanov 66'; Gabrovski (red card) 71' | Stadium: Praterstadion; Attendance: 25,000; Referee: František Cejnar (Czechoslovakia) |

| 29 April 1934 FIFA World Cup qualification | Hungary | 4–1 | Bulgaria | Budapest, Hungary |
| | Szabó 9', 58'; Solti 60', 73' | Report | Todorov 61' | Stadium: Hungária-körút; Attendance: 10,000; Referee: Hans Frankenstein (Austria) |

| 25 December 1934–35 Balkan Cup | Yugoslavia | 4–3 | Bulgaria | Athens, Greece |
| 15:00 (+2:00) | Sekulić 3'; Tomašević 7'; Tirnanić 28', 48' | Report | Peshev 1', 78'; Todorov 23' | Stadium: Leoforos Alexandras Stadium; Attendance: 6,000; Referee: Sotiris Asprogerakas (Greece) |

| 30 December 1934–35 Balkan Cup | Bulgaria | 2 – 3 | Romania | Athens, Greece |
| | Angelov 46', 50' | report | 14', 31' Bodola; 37' Ciolac | Stadium: Leoforos Alexandras Stadium; Attendance: 2,500; Referee: Sotiris Asprogerakas (Greece) |

==== 1935 ====
| 1 January 1934–35 Balkan Cup | Greece | 1–2 | Bulgaria | Athens, Greece |
| 13:30 | Vazos 51' | Report | Lozanov 44'; Panchev 84' | Stadium: Leoforos Alexandras Stadium; Attendance: 20,000; Referee: Bora Vasiljević (Yugoslavia) |

| 26 May Friendly | Bulgaria | 2–0 | Germany | Sofia, Bulgaria |
| | Staykov 85'; Angelov 88' | Report | | Stadium: A.S. 23 Stadium; Attendance: 15,000; Referee: Nikola Dosev (Bulgaria) |

| 16 June 1935 Balkan Cup | Bulgaria | 5–2 | Greece | Sofia, Bulgaria |
| 17:30 | Peshev 23'; Angelov 26', 28', 63'; Lozanov 68' | Report | Choumis 21', 74' | Stadium: Yunak Stadium; Attendance: 12,000; Referee: Constantin Rădulescu (Romania) |

| 19 June 1935 Balkan Cup | Bulgaria | 4–0 | Romania | Sofia, Bulgaria |
| | Lozanov 11'; Yordanov 33'; Peshev 49'; Sucitulescu 62' (o.g.) | report | | Stadium: Yunak Stadium; Attendance: 10,000; Referee: Stavros Hatzopoulos (Greece) |

| 24 June 1935 Balkan Cup | Bulgaria | 3–3 | Yugoslavia | Sofia, Bulgaria |
| | Angelov 25', 28', 66' | Report | Marjanović 2'; Vujadinović 19', 75' | Stadium: Yunak Stadium; Attendance: 25,000; Referee: Stavros Hatzopoulos (Greece) |

| 20 October 1935 Friendly | Germany | 4–2 | Bulgaria | Leipzig, Germany |
| 15:00 (+1:00) | Simetsreiter 29', 68'; Lehner 30'; Poertgen 73' | Report | Peshev 53'; Stoichkov 63' | Stadium: Probstheidaer Stadion; Attendance: 29,000; Referee: Mihály Iváncsics (Hungary) |

==== 1936 ====
| 21 May 1936 Balkan Cup | Bulgaria | 5–4 | Greece | Bucharest, Romania |
| 17:30 | Panchev 25', 76'; Rafailov 31'; Angelov 31'; Lozanov 73' | Report | Migiakis 12'; Vikelidis 69'; Choumis 84', 86' | Stadium: Stadionul Republicii; Attendance: 20,000; Referee: Peco Bauwens (Germany) |

| 24 May 1936 Balkan Cup | Romania | 4–1 | Bulgaria | Bucharest, Romania |
| | Schwartz 10', 55'; Ciolac 66'; Dobay 69' | Report | 35' Angelov | Stadium: Stadionul ONEF; Attendance: 20,000; Referee: Peco Bauwens (Germany) |

==== 1937 ====
| 7 November 1938 World Cup qualifying | Bulgaria | 1–1 | Czechoslovakia | Sofia, Bulgaria |
| 15:00 (+2:00) | Panchediev 89' (pen.) | Report | Ríha 44' | Stadium: Junak Stadion; Attendance: 15,000; Referee: Rinaldo Barlassina (Italy) |

==== 1938 ====
| 24 March Friendly | France | 6–1 | Bulgaria | Paris, France |
| | Nicolas 6', 87'; Aston 29', 52'; Aznar 79'; Veinante 83' | Report1; Report2 | Jordan 67' (o.g.) | Stadium: Parc des Princes; Attendance: 28,512; Referee: Walter Lewington (England) |

| 24 April 1938 World Cup qualifying | Czechoslovakia | 6–0 | Bulgaria | Prague, Czechoslovakia |
| 16:30 (+1:00) | Šimůnek 21', 79', 89'; Nejedlý 57', 77'; Ludl 73' | Report | | Stadium: AC Sparta Stadion; Attendance: 28,000; Referee: Pál von Hertzka (Hungary) |

| 2 October Friendly | Bulgaria | 1–3 | Germany | Sofia, Bulgaria |
| 16:00 (UTC+2:00) | Angelov 29' | Report | | Stadium: Stadionul Yunak; Attendance: 10,000; Referee: Mika Popović (Yugoslavia) |

==== 1939 ====
| 24 May Friendly | Bulgaria | 3–0 | Czechoslovakia | Sofia, Bulgaria |
| 17:00 (UTC+2:00) | Bobev 6'; Angelov 18'; Pachedzhiev 43' | Report | | Stadium: Junak Stadion; Attendance: 12,000; Referee: Mika Popović (Yugoslavia) |

| 22 October Friendly | Bulgaria | 1–2 | Germany | Sofia, Bulgaria |
| 15:30 (+2:00) | Yordanov 72' | Report | 21' Urban; 39' Conen | Stadium: Stadionul Yunak; Attendance: 15,000; Referee: Vasa Stefanović (Yugoslavia) |

=== 1940s ===
==== 1940 ====
| 6 June Friendly | Bulgaria | 1–4 | Slovakia | Sofia, Bulgaria |
| 17:00 (+2:00) | Stojanov 4' | Report | Bolček 35'; Luknár 47'; Földeš 55'; Vysocký 85' | Stadium: Yunak Stadium; Attendance: 5,360; Referee: Mika Popović (Yugoslavia) |

| 20 October Friendly | Germany | 7–3 | Bulgaria | Munich, Germany |
| 15:00 (+2:00) | Gärtner 12'; Kupfer 17'; Conen 19' (pen.), 60', 63', 74'; Lehner 77' | Report | Evtimov 20', 36'; Angelov 75' | Stadium: Sportplatz an der Grünwalder Straße; Attendance: 30,000; Referee: Ernő Kiss (Hungary) |

==== 1942 ====
| 12 April Friendly | Croatia | 6–0 | Bulgaria | Zagreb, Croatia |
| | Kacian 20'; Wölfl 26', 48'; Cimermančić 38'; Pleše 71'; Antolković 86' | Report1; Report2 | | Stadium: Igralište Concordije; Attendance: 15,000; Referee: Josef Mohler (Slovakia) |

| 19 July Friendly | Bulgaria | 0–3 | Germany | Sofia, Bulgaria |
| 18:15 (UTC+2:00) | | Report | 1', 42' Decker; 31' Arlt | Stadium: Stadionul Yunak; Attendance: 12,000; Referee: Jozef Mohler (Slovakia) |

==== 1943 ====
| 6 June Friendly | Bulgaria | 2–4 | Hungary | Sofia, Bulgaria |
| 17:45 (+2:00) | Milev 61'; Spasov 81' | Report | Zsengellér 3', 14', 8', 69' | Stadium: Stadionul Yunak; Attendance: 15,000; Referee: Antun Marek (Croatia) |

==== 1946 ====
| 8 October 1946 Balkan Cup | Bulgaria | 2–2 | Romania | Tirana, Albania |
| | Negrescu 33' (aut.); Milev 22' | Report | 40' Reuter; 88' Tóth | Stadium: Stadiumi Kombetar Qemal Stafa; Attendance: 20,000; Referee: Marijan Matančić, Yugoslavia |

| 9 October 1946 Balkan Cup | Albania | 3–1 | Bulgaria | Tirana, Albania |
| | Boriçi 30', 65' (pen.); Mirashi 68' | Report | Spasov 5' | Stadium: Stadiumi Kombetar Qemal Stafa; Attendance: 20,000; Referee: Radu Istrate |

| 13 October 1946 Balkan Cup | Yugoslavia | 2–1 | Bulgaria | Tirana, Albania |
| | Sandić 35', 70' | Report | Laskov 88' | Stadium: Qemal Stafa Stadium; Attendance: 25,000; Referee: Qazim Dervishi (Albania) |

==== 1947 ====
| 15 June 1947 Balkan Cup | Bulgaria | 2–0 | Albania | Sofia, Bulgaria |
| | Stankov 1', 20' | | | Stadium: Stadium Yunak; Attendance: 30,000; Referee: Miljenko Podubsky |

| 6 July 1947 Balkan Cup | Bulgaria | 2–3 | Romania | Sofia, Bulgaria |
| | Stankov 47'; Iordanov 82' | Report | 38' Băcuț; 59' Petschovski; 61' Marian | Stadium: Stadionul Yunak; Attendance: 25.000; Referee: Marijan Matančić (Yugoslavia) |

| 17 August 1947 Balkan Cup | Hungary | 9–0 | Bulgaria | Budapest, Hungary |
| | Deák 15', 34', 52', 79'; Zsolnai 26'; Hidegkuti 47', 50', 86'; Nagymarosi 48' | Report | | Stadium: Üllői út Attendance: 20,000; Referee: Constantin Iliescu (Romania) |

| 12 October 1947 Balkan Cup | Yugoslavia | 2–1 | Bulgaria | Zagreb, Yugoslavia |
| | Mihajlović 18', 43' | Report | Stankov 12' | Stadium: NK Zagreb Stadium; Attendance: 15,000; Referee: Béla Varga (Hungary) |

==== 1948 ====
| 4 April 1948 Balkan Cup | Bulgaria | 1–1 | Poland | Yunak Stadium, Sofia |
| | Stankov 18' | Report | Parpan 23' | Attendance: 30,000; Referee: Miljenko Podubsky (Yugoslavia) |

| 20 June 1948 Balkan Cup | Romania | 3–2 | Bulgaria | Bucharest, Romania |
| | Farkaș 22', 71'; Dumitrescu 78' | Report | 14' Țvetkov; 15' Argirov | Stadium: Stadionul Giulești; Attendance: 20,000; Referee: György Szigeti (Hungary) |

| 4 July 1948 Balkan Cup | Bulgaria | 1–3 | Yugoslavia | Sofia, Bulgaria |
| | Argirov 32' | Report | Wölfl 41'; Mitić 54'; Že. Čajkovski 72' | Stadium: Yunak Stadium; Attendance: 30,000; Referee: Constantin Iliescu (Romania) |

| 29 August 1948 Balkan Cup | Bulgaria | 1–0 | Czechoslovakia | Yunak Stadium, Sofia |
| | Milev 37' | Report | | Attendance: 30,000; Referee: Constantin Iliescu (Romania) |

| 7 November 1948 Balkan Cup | Bulgaria | 1–0 | Hungary | Sofia, Bulgaria |
| | Milanov 15' | Report | | Stadium: Yunak Stadium; Attendance: 35,000; Referee: Constantin Iliescu (Romania) |

==== 1949 ====
| 4 September Friendly | Czechoslovakia | 1–3 | Bulgaria | Prague, Czechoslovakia |
| 17:30 (UTC+2:00) | Marko 62' (pen.) | Report | Laskov 40'; Spasov 56'; Milanov 87' | Stadium: Great Strahov Stadium; Attendance: 60,000; Referee: Árpád Kamarás (Hungary) |

| 2 October Friendly | Poland | 3–2 | Czechoslovakia | Warsaw, Poland |
| 14:30 (UTC+1:00) | Cieślik 25', 34'; Alszer 38' | Report | Spasov 18'; Bozhkov 64' | Stadium: Stadion Wojska Polskiego; Attendance: 45,000; Referee: Árpád Kamarás (Hungary) |

| 30 October Friendly | Hungary | 5–0 | Bulgaria | Hungary |
| 14:00 | Deák 17'; Budai 57'; Rudas 67'; Puskás 70', 84' | Report | | Attendance: 36,000; Referee: Jaroslav Vlček (Czechoslovakia) |

| 17 November Friendly | Bulgaria | 0–0 | Albania | Sofia, Bulgaria |
| 15:00 CEST | | | | Stadium: C.D.N.V. Stadium; Attendance: 30,000; Referee: Jaroslav Vlček |

=== 1950s ===
==== 1950 ====
| 4 June Friendly | Albania | 2–1 | Bulgaria | Tirana, Albania |
| | Boriçi 21'; Biçaku 56' | | Spasov 75' | Stadium: Stadiumi Kombetar Qemal Stafa; Attendance: 30,000; Referee: Jaroslav Vlček |

| 27 August Friendly | Bulgaria | 1–2 | Czechoslovakia | Sofia, Bulgaria |
| 17:00 CEST | Trendafilov 6' | Report | Preis 65'; Hlaváček 80' | Stadium: C.D.N.V. Stadium; Attendance: 25,000; Referee: Ştefan Alexandriu (Romania) |

| 30 October Friendly | Bulgaria | 0–1 | Poland | Sofia, Bulgaria |
| 15:15 CEST | | Report | Cieślik 29' | Stadium: C.D.N.V. Stadium; Attendance: 20,000; Referee: Ştefan Geac (Romania) |

| 12 November Friendly | Bulgaria | 1–1 | Hungary | Sofia, Bulgaria |
| 15:00 (UTC+2:00) | Dimitrov 2' | Report | Szilágyi 4' | Stadium: C.D.N.V. Stadium; Attendance: 30,000; Referee: Jaroslav Vlček (Czechoslovakia) |

==== 1952 ====
| 18 May Friendly | Poland | 0–1 | Bulgaria | Warsaw, Poland |
| 15:30 | | Report | Milanov 45' | Stadium: Stadion Wojska Polskiego; Attendance: 45,000; Referee: Andor Dorogi (Hungary) |

| 15 July 1952 Olympic Games preliminary round | Soviet Union | 2–1 (a.e.t.) | Bulgaria | Kotka, Finland |
| 19:00 | Bobrov 100'; Trofimov 104' | =197060/match=32377/index.html Report | Kolev 95' | Stadium: Kotkan Urheilukeskus; Attendance: 10,637; Referee: Istvan Zsolt (Hungary) |

==== 1953 ====
| 14 June Friendly | East Germany | 0–0 | Bulgaria | Dresden, East Germany |
| 16:30 (UTC+1:00) | | Report | | Stadium: Heinz-Steyer-Stadion; Attendance: 55,000; Referee: György Dankó (Hungary) |

| 28 June 1954 WCQ | Romania | 3–1 | Bulgaria | Bucharest, Romania |
| | Petschovski 20', 30' (pen.); Ene 82' | report | 53' Dobromir Tașkov | Stadium: Stadionul Republicii; Attendance: 45.000; Referee: Gerhard Schulz (East Germany) |

| 6 September 1954 WCQ | Bulgaria | 1–2 | Czechoslovakia | Sofia, Bulgaria |
| | Bozhkov 55' (pen.) | Report | Vlk 5', 40' | Stadium: Vasil Levski National Stadium; Attendance: 40,000; Referee: Aleksandrowicz (Poland) |

| 13 September Friendly | Bulgaria | 2–2 | Hungary | Sofia, Bulgaria |
| 17:00 (UTC+2:00) | Dimitrov 44', 67' | Report | Sobek 58'; Wiśniowski 75' | Stadium: Vasil Levski National Stadium; Attendance: 40,000; Referee: István Zsolt (Hungary) |

| 4 October Friendly | Bulgaria | 1–1 | Hungary | Sofia, Bulgaria |
| 16:15 (UTC+2:00) | Kolev 74' | Report | Szilágyi 39' | Stadium: Vasil Levski National Stadium; Attendance: 50,000; Referee: Metoděj Charouzek (Czechoslovakia) |

| 11 October 1954 WCQ | Bulgaria | 1–2 | Romania | Sofia, Bulgaria |
| | Kolev 28' | report | 27' Serfözö; 52' Călinoiu | Stadium: Vasil Levski National Stadium; Attendance: 40.000; Referee: (East Germany) Andor Dorogi |

| 8 November 1954 WCQ | Czechoslovakia | 0–0 | Bulgaria | Bratislava, Czechoslovakia |
| | | Report | | Stadium: Tehelne Pole; Attendance: 30,000; Referee: Chkhatarashvili (Soviet Union) |

==== 1954 ====
| 8 August Friendly | Poland | 2–2 | Bulgaria | Warsaw, Poland |
| 16:30 (UTC+1:00) | Trampisz 57', 71' | Report | Kolev 3'; Milanov 32' | Stadium: Stadion Wojska Polskiego; Attendance: 30,000; Referee: György Dankó (Hungary) |

| 24 October Friendly | Bulgaria | 3–1 | East Germany | Sofia, Bulgaria |
| 15:45 (UTC+2:00) | Kolev 11', 67'; Yanev 55' | Report | Meier 83' (pen.) | Stadium: Vasil Levski National Stadium; Attendance: 40,000; Referee: Giorgio Bernardi (Italy) |

==== 1955 ====
| 7 January Friendly | Egypt | 1–0 | Bulgaria | Cairo, Egypt |
| 15:45 (UTC+2:00) | ? | Report | | Stadium: Zamalek SC Stadium; Attendance: 25,000; Referee: Vasilis Diamantopoulos (Greece) |

| 23 January Friendly | Lebanon | 2–3 | Bulgaria | Beirut, Lebanon |
| | ? | Report | Milanov 11', 20', 40' | Stadium: Beirut Municipal Stadium; Attendance: 20,000; Referee: Hussein Imam (Egypt) |

| 22 May Friendly | Bulgaria | 2–1 | Egypt | Sofia, Bulgaria |
| | Milanov 28'; Gugalov 44' | Report | | Stadium: Vasil Levski National Stadium; Attendance: 40,000; Referee: Vasilis Diamantopoulos (Greece) |

| 26 June Friendly | Bulgaria | 1–1 | Poland | Sofia, Bulgaria |
| 18:00 (UTC+2:00) | Bozhkov 71' (pen.) | Report | Brychczy 28' | Stadium: Vasil Levski National Stadium; Attendance: 40,000; Referee: Antonín Vrbovec (Czechoslovakia) |

| 9 October Friendly | Romania | 1–1 | Bulgaria | Bucharest, Romania |
| | Georgescu 32' | report | 65' Panaiotov | Stadium: Stadionul 23 August; Attendance: 70.000; Referee: Carl Steiner (Austria) |

| 23 October 1956 Olympics – Qualifying | Bulgaria | 2–0 | Great Britain | Sofia, Bulgaria |
| | Stefanov 30'; Yanev 61' | Report | | Stadium: Vasil Levski National Stadium; Attendance: 45,000; Referee: Giorgio Bernardi (Italy) |

| 13 November Friendly | Bulgaria | 3–0 | Czechoslovakia | Sofia, Bulgaria |
| 14:45 (UTC+2:00) | Kolev 8'; Bozhkov 58'; Diev 87' | Report | | Stadium: Vasil Levski National Stadium; Attendance: 45,000; Referee: Nikolay Latyshev (Soviet Union) |

| 20 November Friendly | East Germany | 1–0 | Bulgaria | East Berlin, East Germany |
| 14:00 (UTC+1:00) | Tröger 23' | Report | | Stadium: Walter-Ulbricht-Stadion; Attendance: 65,000; Referee: Leo Horn (Netherlands) |

==== 1956 ====
| 12 May 1956 Olympics – Qualifying | Great Britain | 3–3 | Bulgaria | London, United Kingdom |
| | Hardisty 12', 62'; Lewis 77' (pen.) | Report | Milanov 28'; Prince 32' (o.g.); Dimitrov 66' | Stadium: Wembley Stadium; Attendance: 30,000; Referee: Giorgio Bernardi (Italy) |

| 26 August Friendly | Poland | 1–2 | Bulgaria | Wrocław, Poland |
| 17:00 (UTC+1:00) | Pol 74' | Report | Milanov 69'; Kolev 83' | Stadium: Olympic Stadium; Attendance: 60,000; Referee: Sándor Harangozó (Hungary) |

| 10 September Friendly | Bulgaria | 2–0 | Romania | Sofia, Bulgaria |
| | Milanov 53'; Ianev 85' | Report | | Stadium: Stadionul Național Vasil Levski; Attendance: 40.000; Referee: Vasilis Diamantopoulos (Greece) |

| 14 October Friendly | Bulgaria | 3–1 | East Germany | Sofia, Bulgaria |
| 15:30 (UTC+2:00) | Panayotov 25'; Kolev 62', 89' | Report | Wirth 46' | Stadium: Vasil Levski National Stadium; Attendance: 40,000; Referee: Józef Kowal (Poland) |

| 30 November 1956 Olympic quarter-finals | Bulgaria | 6–1 | Great Britain | Olympic Park Stadium, Melbourne |
| 16:30 AEST (UTC+10) | Dimitrov 6'; Kolev 40', 85'; Milanov 45', 75', 80' | =197070/match=32402/index.html Report | Lewis 30' | Attendance: 6,748; Referee: Ron Wright (Australia) |

| 5 December 1956 Olympic semifinals | Soviet Union | 2–1 (a.e.t.) | Bulgaria | Olympic Park Stadium, Melbourne |
| 16:30 AEST (UTC+10) | Streltsov 112'; Tatushin 116' | =197072/match=32406/index.html Report | Kolev 95' | Attendance: 21,079; Referee: Robert Mann (Great Britain) |

| 7 December 1956 Olympic Bronze medal match | Bulgaria | 3–0 | India | Melbourne Cricket Ground, Melbourne |
| 14:15 AEST (UTC+10) | Diev 37', 60'; Milanov 42' | =197073/match=32407/index.html Report | | Attendance: 21,236; Referee: Nikolay Latyshev (Soviet Union) |

==== 1957 ====
| 22 May 1958 World Cup qualification | Norway | 1–2 | Bulgaria | Oslo, Norway |
| | Hennum 47' | Report | Dimitrov 38', 75' | Stadium: Ullevaal; Attendance: 27,542; Referee: Gösta Lindberg (Sweden) |

| 23 June 1958 World Cup qualification | Hungary | 4–1 | Bulgaria | Budapest, Hungary |
| | Machos 5', 14', 30'; Bozsik 52' | Report | Kolev 69' | Stadium: Nepstaditon; Attendance: 60,000; Referee: Guigue (France) |

| 21 July Friendly | Bulgaria | 0–4 | Soviet Union | Sofia, Bulgaria |
| | | | Streltsov 40', 56'; Ilyin 43'; Isayev 61' | Stadium: Vasil Levski Stadium; Attendance: 45,000; Referee: Dumitru Schulder (Romania) |

| 15 September 1958 World Cup qualification | Bulgaria | 1–2 | Hungary | Sofia, Bulgaria |
| | Diev 43' | Report | Hidegkuti 2', 34' | Stadium: Vasil Levski; Attendance: 50,000; Referee: Giorgio Bernardi (Italy) |

| 29 September Friendly | Bulgaria | 1–1 | Poland | Sofia, Bulgaria |
| 16:00 (UTC+2:00) | Milanov 72' | Report | Brychczy 40' | Stadium: Vasil Levski National Stadium; Attendance: 40,000; Referee: Édouard Harzic (France) |

| 3 November 1958 World Cup qualification | Bulgaria | 7–0 | Norway | Sofia, Bulgaria |
| | Iliev 6', 60', 74'; Panayotov 29', 32'; Yanev 59'; Debarski 77' | Report | | Stadium: Vasil Levski; Attendance: 22,120; Referee: Martin Macko (Czechoslovakia) |

| 25 December Friendly | France | 2 – 2 | Bulgaria | Paris, France |
| 14:30 (+1:00) | Wisnieski 11'; Douis 56' | Report; Report | Diev 55'; Nestorov 75' | Stadium: Parc des Princes; Attendance: 38,086; Referee: Günther Ternieden (West Germany) |

==== 1958 ====
| 14 May Friendly | Brazil | 4–0 | Bulgaria | Rio de Janeiro, Brazil |
| 21:30 (UTC-3:00) | | Report | | Stadium: Maracanã Stadium; Attendance: 140,000; Referee: Esteban Marino (Uruguay) |

| 18 May Friendly | Brazil | 3–1 | Bulgaria | São Paulo, Brazil |
| 15:15 (UTC-3:00) | | Report | Diev 8' | Stadium: Pacaembu Stadium; Attendance: 70,000; Referee: Esteban Marino (Uruguay) |

| 5 October Friendly | East Germany | 1–1 | Bulgaria | East Berlin, East Germany |
| 15:00 (UTC+1:00) | Tröger 30' | Report | Milanov 80' | Stadium: Walter-Ulbricht-Stadion; Attendance: 50,000; Referee: Helge Andersen (Denmark) |

| 12 October Friendly | Czechoslovakia | 0–1 | Bulgaria | Ostrava, Czechoslovakia |
| 15:00 (UTC+1:00) | | Report | Milanov 23' | Stadium: Stadion V.Ž.K.G. Attendance: 25,000; Referee: Alfred Grill (Austria) |

| 7 December Friendly | Turkey | 0–0 | Bulgaria | Ankara, Turkey |
| 14:00 (UTC+2:00) | Aklamuz 8'; Yüksel 17' | Report | 22', 24', 85' Bartu; 37', 51' Has; 43', 64', 68' Küçükandonyadis; 53' Özacar | Stadium: Ankara 19 Mayıs Stadium; Attendance: 31,917; Referee: Josef Stoll (Austria) |

| 21 December Friendly | East Germany | 3–0 | Bulgaria | Augsburg, West Germany |
| 14:00 (UTC+1:00) | Seeler 44', 74'; Waldner 51' | Report | | Stadium: Rosenaustadion; Attendance: 55,896; Referee: Friedrich Seipelt (Austria) |

==== 1959 ====
| 13 May Friendly | Bulgaria | 3–2 | Netherlands | Sofia, Bulgaria |
| | Kolev 39' (pen.); Vasilev 41', 67' | Report | Canjels 12', 66' | Stadium: Vasil Levski National Stadium; Attendance: 30,000; Referee: Alfred Grill (Austria) |

| 31 May 1960 European Nations' Cup qualifying Round of 16 | Yugoslavia | 2–0 | Bulgaria | Belgrade, Yugoslavia |
| | Galić 1'; Tasić 87' | | | Stadium: JNA Stadium; Attendance: 23,418; Referee: Mihai Popa (Romania) |

| 27 June 1960 Olympic Games qualifiers | Soviet Union | 1–1 | Bulgaria | Moscow, Soviet Union |
| | Korolenkov 68' | Report | Milanov 26' | Stadium: Lenin Central Stadium; Attendance: 102,000; Referee: Bengt Lundell (Sweden) |

| 13 September 1960 Olympic Games qualifiers | Bulgaria | 1–0 | Soviet Union | Sofia, Bulgaria |
| | Kolev 11' | Report | | Stadium: Vasil Levski National Stadium; Attendance: 45,000; Referee: Josef Stoll (Austria) |

| 11 October Friendly | Bulgaria | 1 – 0 | France | Sofia, Bulgaria |
| | Kolev 88' | Report1; Report2 | Fontaine (red card) 89' | Stadium: Vasil Levski National Stadium; Attendance: 45,000; Referee: Josef Stoll (Austria) |

| 25 October 1960 European Nations' Cup qualifying Round of 16 | Bulgaria | 1–1 | Yugoslavia | Sofia, Bulgaria |
| | Diev 55' | | Mujić 57' | Stadium: Vasil Levski National Stadium; Attendance: 27,560; Referee: Kurt Tschenscher (Germany) |

| 8 November 1960 Olympic Games qualifiers | Romania | 1–0 | Bulgaria | Bucharest, Romania |
| | Constantin 80' | Report | | Stadium: Stadionul 23 August; Attendance: 80,000; Referee: János Pósa (Hungary) |

| 6 December Friendly | Bulgaria | 2–1 | Denmark | Sofia, Bulgaria |
| | Abadjiev 24'; Dimitrov 73' | Report | Enoksen 14' | Stadium: Vasil Levski National Stadium; Attendance: 30,000; Referee: Edgars Klavs (Soviet Union) |
