= Turkey national football team results (1923–1960) =

This is a list of the Turkey national football team results from 1923 to 1960.

== 1920s ==
26 October 1923 Friendly	Turkey	2 – 2	Romania	(Turkey) Taksim Stadium, Istanbul
	Sporel 32', 50'	(Report)	20', 53' Gansl	Attendance: 7,500; Referee: (Czechoslovakia) Anton Krátký

25 May 1924 1924 OG	Czechoslovakia	5 – 2	Turkey	(France) Stade Bergeyre, Paris
	Sloup 21'; Sedláček 28', 37'; Novák 64'; Čapek 74'	(Report)	63', 82' Refet	Attendance: 4,344; Referee: (Norway) Peder Christian Andersen

17 June 1924 Friendly	Finland	2 – 4	Turkey	(Finland) Töölön Pallokenttä, Helsinki
	Kelin 28'; Fallström 86'	(Report)	3', 15', 37', 87' Sporel	Attendance: 6,000; Referee: (Finland) Gösta Löfgren

19 June 1924 Friendly	Estonia	1 – 4	Turkey	(Estonia) Kalevi Keskstaadion, Tallinn
	Üpraus 86'	(Report)	24' Arca; 67' Gürsoy; 72', 75' Sporel	Attendance: 4,800; Referee: (Estonia) Julius Reinans

22 June 1924 Friendly	Latvia	1 – 3	Turkey	(Latvia) LSB Stadions, Riga
	Bārda 56'	(Report)	11', 16', 68' Sporel	Attendance: 5,000; Referee: (Estonia) August Silber-Sillak

29 June 1924 Friendly	Poland	2 – 0	Turkey	(Poland) Łódź City Stadium, Łódź
	Balcer 42'; Reyman 43'	(Report)		Attendance: 6,000; Referee: (Hungary) Mihály Ivancsics

16 November 1924 Friendly	Soviet Union	3 – 0	Turkey	(Soviet Union) Stadion Imeni Vorovskogo, Moscow
	Butusov 14', 25'; Shpakovsky 70'	(Report)		Attendance: 15,000; Referee: (Turkey) Hamdi Emin Çap

10 April 1925 Friendly	Turkey	2 – 1	Bulgaria	(Turkey) Taksim Stadium, Istanbul
	Leblebi 31'; Arca 67'	(Report)	74' Mutafchiev	Attendance: 4,000; Referee: (England) W. H. Allen

1 May 1925 Friendly	Romania	1 – 2	Turkey	(Romania) Stadionul Romcomit, Bucharest
	Brauchler 72'	(Report)	62' Sporel; 85' Leblebi	Attendance: 15,000; Referee: (Romania) Albert Rolton

15 May 1925 Friendly	Turkey	1 – 2	Soviet Union	(Turkey) İstiklâl Stadium, Ankara
	Arca 3'	(Report)	82' Selin; 85' Butusov	Attendance: 5,000; Referee: (Turkey) Hamdi Emin Çap

2 October 1925 Friendly	Turkey	1 – 2	Poland	(Turkey) Taksim Stadium, Istanbul
	Sporel 5'	(Report)	29' Adamek; 67' Sperling	Attendance: 7,000; Referee: (Germany) P.J. Bauwens

7 May 1926 Friendly	Turkey	1 – 3	Romania	(Turkey) Taksim Stadium, Istanbul
	Peykoğlu 71'	(Report)	54', 63' Semler; 59' Matek	Attendance: 5,000; Referee: (England) W.H. Allen

12 September 1926 Friendly	Poland	6 – 1	Turkey	(Poland) Polish Army Stadium, Lemberg
	Steuermann 50', 68', 71'; Batsch 27', 77'; Balcer 48'	(Report)	86' Baydar	Attendance: 10,000; Referee: (Czech Republic) František Cejnar

17 July 1927 Friendly	Bulgaria	3 – 3	Turkey	(Bulgaria) Slavia Stadium, Sofia
	Liutskanov 37', 66'; Stoyanov 83'	(Report)	2', 5' Yalınlı; 75' Faruki	Attendance: 10,000; Referee: (Hungary) Ede Vicenik

14 October 1927 Friendly	Turkey	3 – 1	Bulgaria	(Turkey) Taksim Stadium, Istanbul
	Sporel 25', 65'; Bekdik 85'	(Report)	72' Manolov	Attendance: 8,000; Referee: (Romania) Vasile Nicolaeviciu

8 April 1928 Friendly	Yugoslavia	2 – 1	Turkey	(Kingdom of Yugoslavia) Stadion Kranjčevićeva, Zagreb
	Babić 39'; Giler 41'	(Report)	62' Yalınlı	Attendance: 5,000; Referee: (Hungary) Mihály Ivanicsics

15 April 1928 Friendly	Romania	4 – 2	Turkey	(Romania) Stadionul Gloria-CFR, Bistrița
	Wetzer 40'; Uluğ 55' (o.g.); Sepi 68'; Nagy-Csomag 83'	(Report)	18' Faruki; 73' Atak	Attendance: 3,000; Referee: (Kingdom of Yugoslavia) Josip Fabris

28 May 1928 1928 OG	Egypt	7 – 1	Turkey	(Netherlands) Olympic Stadium, Amsterdam
	El-Hassany 20' (pen.); Riad 27'; Mokhtar 46', 50', 63'; El-Sayed Hooda 53'; El-Zobeir 86'	(Report)	71' Refet	Attendance: 2,744; Referee: (France) Marcel Slawik

== 1930s ==
27 September 1931 1931 Balkan C	Bulgaria	5 – 1	Turkey	(Bulgaria) Vasil Levski Stadium, Sofia
	Lozanov 4'; Panchev 50', 76', 80'; Stoyanov 50'	(Report)	31' Yeten	Attendance: 10,000; Referee: (Hungary) Mihály Ivanicsics

2 October 1931 1931 Balkan C	Yugoslavia	0 – 2	Turkey	(Bulgaria) Vasil Levski Stadium, Sofia
		(Report)	7' Erkal; 25' Arıcan	Attendance: 8,000; Referee: (Hungary) Mihály Ivanicsics

17 April 1932 Friendly	Turkey	1 – 2	Hungary B	(Turkey) Taksim Stadium, Istanbul
	Almay 55'	(Report)	80' (pen.) Bihámy; 84' Kármán	Attendance: 10,000; Referee: (England) W. H. Allen

22 April 1932 Friendly	Turkey	1 – 4	Hungary B	(Turkey) Taksim Stadium, Istanbul
	Almay 35' (pen.)	(Report)	17', 76' Gergely; 61' Bihámy; 89' Tunyogi	Attendance: 8,000; Referee: (England) W. H. Allen

4 November 1932 Friendly	Turkey	2 – 3	Bulgaria	(Turkey) Taksim Stadium, Istanbul
	Bilgiç 6'; Almay 52'	(Report)	55' Staykov; 63' Peshev; 81' Angelov	Attendance: 5,000; Referee: (Kingdom of Yugoslavia) Bora Vasiliević

12 July 1936 Friendly	Turkey	3 – 3	Yugoslavia	(Turkey) Taksim Stadium, Istanbul
	Görkey 4'; Sel 42'; Arıcan 82'	(Report)	15' Marjanović; 35' Tomašević; 76' Tirnanić	Attendance: 8,000; Referee: (Hungary) Klein Árpád

3 August 1936 1936 OG	Norway	4 – 0	Turkey	(Germany) Mommsenstadion, Berlin
	Martinsen 30', 70'; Brustad 53'; Kvammen 80'	(Report)		Attendance: 8,000; Referee: (Italy) Giuseppe Scarpi

1 August 1937 Friendly	Yugoslavia	3 – 1	Turkey	(Kingdom of Yugoslavia) Stadion Jugoslavija, Belgrade
	Pleše 4'; Lešnik 51'; Božović 79'	(Report)	63' Minkari	Attendance: 8,000; Referee: (Italy) Rinaldo Barlassina

== 1940s ==
23 April 1948 Friendly	Greece	1 – 3	Turkey	(Greece) Leoforos Alexandras Stadium, Athens
	Vikelidis 70'	(Report)	9' Kırcan; 30' Küçükandonyadis; 74' Gülesin	Attendance: 8,000; Referee: (Italy) Generoso Dattilo

30 May 1948 Friendly	Turkey	0 – 1	Austria	(Turkey) İnönü Stadium, Istanbul
		(Report)	15' Körner	Attendance: 17,000; Referee: (Italy) Giovanni Galeati

2 August 1948 1948 OG	Turkey	4 – 0	China	(United Kingdom) Green Pond Road, Walthamstow
	Kılıç 18' 61'; Saygun 72'; Küçükandonyadis 87'	(Report)		Attendance: 21,708; Referee: (Austria) Johann Beck

5 August 1948 1948 OG	Yugoslavia	3 – 1	Turkey	(United Kingdom) Lynn Road, Ilford
	Čajkovski 21'; Bobek 60'; Wölfl 80'	(Report)	33' Gülesin	Attendance: 8,000; Referee: (France) Victor Sdez

28 November 1948 Friendly	Turkey	2 – 1	Greece	(Turkey) İnönü Stadium, Istanbul
	Eken 3', 19'	(Report)	44' Fylaktos	Attendance: 9,000; Referee: (Italy) Generoso Dattilo

20 March 1949 Friendly	Austria	1 – 0	Turkey	(Austria) Praterstadion, Vienna
	Decker 45'	(Report)		Attendance: 62,000; Referee: (Italy) Giuseppe Carpani

12 May 1949 1949 MC	Egypt	2 – 3	Turkey	(Greece) Leoforos Alexandras Stadium, Athens
	El-Attiyah 11'; Rahman 74'	(Report 1)&(Report 2)	38' Kılıç; 46' Esel; 86' Gülesin	Attendance: 20,000; Referee: (Italy) Agostino Gamba

16 May 1949 1949 MC	Greece	1 – 2	Turkey	(Greece) Leoforos Alexandras Stadium, Athens
	Markopoulos 49'	(Report)	33' Kılıç; 44' Eken	Attendance: 15,000; Referee: (Egypt) Mohammed El Sayed

20 May 1949 1949 MC	Italy B	3 – 2	Turkey	(Greece) Leoforos Alexandras Stadium, Athens
	Baldini 3', 20'; Galassi 79'	(Report)	10' Gülesin; 18' Esel	Attendance: 15,000; Referee: (Greece) Vasilis Diamantopoulos

20 November 1949 1950 WC Q.	Turkey	7 – 0	Syria	(Turkey) 19 Mayıs Stadium, Ankara
	Cansever 12', 16', 87'; Eken 44'; Küçükandonyadis 66'; Keskin 67'; Kılıç 72'	(Report)		Attendance: 35,000; Referee: (Italy) Antonio Gamba

== 1950–1954 ==
28 May 1950 Friendly	Turkey	6 – 1	Iran	(Turkey) İnönü Stadium, Istanbul
	Eken 16', 33', 38'; Deringör 21'; Küçükandonyadis 48', 87'	(Report)	3' Khalili	Attendance: 15,000; Referee: (Egypt) Mohammed El Sayed

28 October 1950 Friendly	Israel	5 – 1	Turkey	(Israel) Maccabiah Stadium, Tel Aviv
	Glazer 41', 58', 71'; Gambash 27', 88'	(Report)	64' Eken	Attendance: 20,000; Referee: (Italy) Giuseppe Carpani

3 December 1950 Friendly	Turkey	3 – 2	Israel	(Turkey) İnönü Stadium, Istanbul
	Deringör 41'; Açıksöz 64'; Küçükandonyadis 85'	(Report)	36', 39' Glazer	Attendance: 35,000; Referee: (Italy) Agostino Gamba

10 June 1951 Friendly	Sweden	3 – 1	Turkey	(Sweden) Råsunda Stadium, Stockholm
	Sandin 57', 74'; Lundqvist 76'	(Report)	50' Küçükandonyadis	Attendance: 19,992; Referee: (Finland) Wolf Waldemar Karni

17 June 1951 Friendly	West Germany	1 – 2	Turkey	(Germany) Olympic Stadium, West Berlin
	Haferkamp 66'	(Report)	5' Adanır; 85' Tokaç	Attendance: 90,000; Referee: (Italy) Giuseppe Carpani

14 November 1951 Friendly	Turkey	1 – 0	Sweden	(Turkey) İnönü Stadium, Istanbul
	Tucaltan 58'	(Report)		Attendance: 22,640; Referee: (Italy) Giuseppe Carpani

21 November 1951 Friendly	Turkey	0 – 2	West Germany	(Turkey) İnönü Stadium, Istanbul
		(Report)	56', 60' Morlock	Attendance: 25,000; Referee: (England) Arthur Edward Ellis

1 June 1952 Friendly	Turkey	1 – 5	Switzerland	(Turkey) 19 Mayıs Stadium, Ankara
	İstanbulluoğlu 78'	(Report)	19', 63' Riva; 24', 76' Hügi; 34' Pasteur	Attendance: 20,000; Referee: (Italy) Ermano Silvano

8 June 1952 Friendly	Turkey	0 – 0	Spain	(Turkey) Mithat Paşa Stadium, Istanbul
		(Report)		Attendance: 30,000; Referee: (Italy) Giuseppe Carpani

25 May 1953 Friendly	Switzerland	1 – 2	Turkey	(Switzerland) Wankdorf Stadium, Bern
	Meier 19'	(Report)	21', 75' İstanbulluoğlu	Attendance: 16,500; Referee: (Italy) Giuseppe Carpani

5 June 1953 Friendly	Turkey	2 – 2	Yugoslavia	(Turkey) Mithat Paşa Stadium, Istanbul
	Sargun 61'; Kırcan 76'	(Report)	31' Rajkov; 88' Mitić	Attendance: 22,467; Referee: (Greece) Kostas Tsitsis

11 December 1953 1953-1958 MG	Turkey	0 – 1	Italy B	(Turkey) Mithat Paşa Stadium, Istanbul
		(Report)	10' Pesaola	Attendance: 22,693; Referee: (Germany) Albert Dusch

6 January 1954 1954 WC Q.	Spain	4 – 1	Turkey	(Spain) Nuevo Estadio Chamartín, Madrid
	Venancio 13'; Gaínza 48'; Alsua 65'; González 49'	(Report)	31' Adanır	Attendance: 110,000; Referee: (France) Raymond Vincenti

14 March 1954 1954 WC Q.	Turkey	1 – 0	Spain	(Turkey) Mithat Paşa Stadium, Istanbul
	Sargun 14'	(Report)		Attendance: 25,449; Referee: (Germany) Emil Schmetzer

17 March 1954 1954 WC TB	Turkey	2 – 2 (AET); TUR won after toss of a coin	Spain	(Italy) Stadio Olimpico, Rome
	Sargun 25'; Mamat 64'	(Report)	11' Arteche; 78' Escudero	Attendance: 60,000; Referee: (Italy) Giorgio Bernardi

17 June 1954 1954 WC	West Germany	4 – 1	Turkey	(Switzerland) Wankdorf Stadium, Bern
18:00 (CET)	Schäfer 14'; Klodt 52'; O. Walter 60'; Morlock 84'	(Report)	2' Mamat	Attendance: 28,000; Referee: (Portugal) Jose da Costa Vieira

20 June 1954 1954 WC	Turkey	7 – 0	South Korea	(Switzerland) Charmilles Stadium, Geneva
17:00 (CET)	Mamat 10', 30'; Küçükandonyadis 24'; Sargun 37', 64', 70'; Keskin 76'	(Report)		Attendance: 3,541; Referee: (Uruguay) Esteban Marino

23 June 1954 1954 WC	West Germany	7 – 2	Turkey	(Switzerland) Hardturm Stadium, Zürich
18:00 (CET)	O. Walter 7'; Schäfer 12', 79'; Morlock 30', 60', 77'; F. Walter 62'	(Report)	21' Ertan; 82' Küçükandonyadis	Attendance: 17,000; Referee: (France) Raymond Vincenti

17 October 1954 Friendly	Yugoslavia	5 – 1	Turkey	(Socialist Federal Republic of Yugoslavia) Koševo Stadium, Sarajevo
	Bobek 40', 41', 71'; Pašić 47'; Marković 78'	(Report)	81' Sargun	Attendance: 36,000; Referee: (Austria) Friedrich Seipelt

== 1955–1960 ==
3 April 1955 1953-1958 MG	Turkey	0 – 0	France B	(Turkey) Mithat Paşa Stadium, Istanbul
		(Report)		Attendance: 24,237; Referee: (Italy) Cesare Jonni

26 June 1955 1953-1958 MG	Italy B	1 – 1	Turkey	(Italy) Stadio Comunale, Trieste
	Bettini 18'	(Report)	78' Küçükandonyadis	Attendance: 37,000; Referee: (Italy) Armando Marchetti

18 December 1955 Friendly	Turkey	3 – 1	Portugal	(Turkey) Mithat Paşa Stadium, Istanbul
	Küçükandonyadis 51'; Oktay 57'; Bilge 72'	(Report)	38' Hernâni	Attendance: 22,313; Referee: (Socialist Federal Republic of Yugoslavia) Mirko Romčević

25 December 1955 1953-1958 MG	France B	3 – 1	Turkey	(France) Parc des Princes, Paris
	Curyl 37', 85'; Schultz 65'	(Report)	65' Oktay	Attendance: 20,000; Referee: (Spain) Manuel Asensi Martín

19 February 1956 Friendly	Turkey	3 – 1	Hungary	(Turkey) Mithat Paşa Stadium, Istanbul
	Küçükandonyadis 6', 38'; Oktay 46'	(Report)	81' Puskás	Attendance: 28,241; Referee: (Socialist Federal Republic of Yugoslavia) Vasa Stefanović

25 March 1956 Friendly	Portugal	3 – 1	Turkey	(Portugal) Estádio Nacional, Lisbon
	M. Vasques 33', 47'; Matateu 79'	(Report)	89' Açıksöz	Attendance: 50,000; Referee: (Germany) Albert Dusch

1 May 1956 Friendly	Turkey	0 – 1	Brazil	(Turkey) Mithat Paşa Stadium, Istanbul
		(Report)	19' Djalma Santos	Attendance: 26,730; Referee: (Italy) Armando Marchetti

16 November 1956 Friendly	Turkey	1 – 1	Poland	(Turkey) Mithat Paşa Stadium, Istanbul
	Oktay 8'	(Report)	2' Pol	Attendance: 26,353; Referee: (Austria) Gustav Jiranek

25 November 1956 Friendly	Czechoslovakia	1 – 1	Turkey	(Czechoslovakia) Strahov Stadium, Prague
	Feureisl 46'	(Report)	43' Öztuna	Attendance: 30,000; Referee: (Austria) Friedrich Mayer

5 April 1957 1953-1958 MG	Egypt	0 – 4	Turkey	(Egypt) Al Zamalek Stadium, Cairo
		(Report)	3', 41', 65' Küçükandonyadis; 72' Kiremitçi	Attendance: 20,000; Referee: (Italy) Giulio Campanati

19 May 1957 Friendly	Poland	0 – 1	Turkey	(Poland) Stadion Dziesięciolecia, Warsaw
		(Report)	42' Beratligil	Attendance: 60,000; Referee: (Austria) Alfred Grill

6 November 1957 Friendly	Spain	3 – 0	Turkey	(Spain) Santiago Bernabéu, Madrid
	Kubala 18', 38' (pen.), 80'	(Report)		Attendance: 23,578; Referee: (Portugal) Francisco Gonçalves Guerra

8 December 1957 Friendly	Turkey	1 – 1	Belgium	(Turkey) 19 Mayıs Stadium, Ankara
	Bartu 18'	(Report)	18' Jurion	Attendance: 38,569; Referee: (Italy) Riccardo Cesare Pieri

4 May 1958 Friendly	Netherlands	1 – 2	Turkey	(Netherlands) Olympic Stadium, Amsterdam
	Wilkes 37'	(Report)	56', 57' Oktay	Attendance: 60,000; Referee: (England) Reg Leafe

26 October 1958 Friendly	Belgium	1 – 1	Turkey	(Belgium) Heysel Stadium, Brussels
	Piters 58'	(Report)	80' Oktay	Attendance: 28,703; Referee: (France) Pierre Schwinte

2 November 1958 1960 ENC Q	Romania	3 – 0	Turkey	(Romania) Stadionul 23 August, Bucharest
	Oaidă 62'; Constantin 77'; Dinulescu 81'	(Report)		Attendance: 67,200; Referee: (Switzerland) Gottfried Dienst

7 December 1958 Friendly	Turkey	0 – 0	Bulgaria	(Turkey) 19 Mayıs Stadium, Ankara
		(Report)		Attendance: 31,917; Referee: (Austria) Josef Stoll

18 December 1958 Friendly	Turkey	1 – 0	Czechoslovakia	(Turkey) Mithat Paşa Stadium, Istanbul
	Has 77'	(Report)		Attendance: 26,853; Referee: (Austria) Carl Erich Steiner

26 April 1959 1960 ENC Q	Turkey	2 – 0	Romania	(Turkey) Mithat Paşa Stadium, Istanbul
	Küçükandonyadis 13' (pen.), 54'	(Report)		Attendance: 27,991; Referee: (Socialist Federal Republic of Yugoslavia) Boris Nedelkovski

10 May 1959 Friendly	Turkey	0 – 0	Netherlands	(Turkey) Mithat Paşa Stadium, Istanbul
		(Report)		Attendance: 28,467; Referee: (Italy) Concetto Lo Bello

8 June 1960 Friendly	Turkey	4 – 2	Scotland	(Turkey) 19 Mayıs Stadium, Ankara
	Küçükandonyadis 33', 52'; Oktay 9'; Birol 63'	(Report)	12' Caldow; 72' A. Young	Attendance: 22,507; Referee: (Austria) Carl Erich Steiner

27 November 1960 Friendly	Bulgaria	2 – 1	Turkey	(Bulgaria) Vasil Levski Stadium, Sofia
	Kolev 50'; Iliev 78'	(Report)	19' Oktay	Attendance: 12,994; Referee: (Denmark) Leo Helge

== Other unofficial games ==
18 September 1931 Friendly	Turkey	6 – 2	(Turkey) İstanbulspor	(Turkey) Fenerbahçe Stadium, Istanbul
	Yeten (4); Arıcan; Seyit	(Report)	Unknown (pen.) Unknown	Referee: (England) Fred Pegnam

8 April 1932 Friendly	Turkey	10 – 5	(Turkey) Beşiktaş	(Turkey) Taksim Stadium, Istanbul
		(Report)		Referee: (England) Fred Pegnam

10 April 1932 Friendly	Turkey	3 – 1	(Turkey) Galatasaray and Vefa XI	(Turkey) Taksim Stadium, Istanbul
	Bilgiç 40', 60'; Sporel 65'	(Report)	70' Unknown

15 April 1932 Friendly	Turkey	6 – 0	(Turkey) Galatasaray and Beşiktaş XI	(Turkey) Taksim Stadium, Istanbul
		(Report)

5 April 1935 Friendly	Turkey	3 – 0	(Turkey) Galatasaray	(Turkey) Taksim Stadium, Istanbul
	Akel 35'; Minkari 65'; Kural 85'	(Report)

8 July 1948 Friendly	Turkey	2 – 2	(Italy) Triestina	(Turkey) İnönü Stadium, Istanbul
		(Report)

13 March 1949 Friendly	Fenerbahçe (Turkey)	1 – 3	Turkey	(Turkey) Fenerbahçe Stadium, Istanbul
	Deringör 38'	(Report)	11' Keskin; 77' Artun; 87' Açıksöz	Referee: (Turkey) Mehmet Reşat Nayır

27 April 1952 Friendly	Turkey	1 – 1	(Brazil) Corinthians	(Turkey) Mithatpaşa Stadium, Istanbul
		(Report)

6 May 1952 Friendly	Turkey	0 – 1	(Brazil) Corinthians	(Turkey) Ankara 19 Mayıs Stadium, Ankara
		(Report)

20 December 1953 Friendly	Turkey	3 – 1	(Brazil) Cruzeiro	(Turkey) Mithatpaşa Stadium, Istanbul
		(Report)

3 October 1954 Friendly	Fenerbahçe (Turkey)	2 – 2	Turkey	(Turkey) İnönü Stadium, Istanbul
		(Report)

29 May 1955 Friendly	Turkey	2 – 4	(Brazil) Fluminense	(Turkey) Dolmabahçe Stadium, Istanbul
		(Report)

26 April 1956 Friendly	Turkey	4 – 1	(Turkey) Emniyet	(Turkey) Fenerbahçe Stadium, Istanbul
	Kırklar 11'; Nemli 16'	(Report)

5 December 1958 Friendly	Gençlerbirliği (Turkey)	2 – 9	Turkey	(Turkey) Ankara 19 Mayıs Stadium, Ankara
	Aklamuz 8'; Yüksel 17'	(Report)	22', 24', 85' Bartu; 37', 51' Has; 43', 64', 68' Küçükandonyadis; 53' Özacar	Referee: (Turkey) Cezmi Başar

15 November 1960 Friendly	Turkey	5 – 1	(Turkey) Beyoğluspor	(Turkey) Dolmabahçe Stadium, Istanbul
		(Report)
