= 1946–47 NK Dinamo Zagreb season =

Dinamo Zagreb
1946–47 season
- Manager: Márton Bukovi (until January 1947); Mirko Kokotović (player-manager)
- 1. Federal League: 2nd place
- Top goalscorer: Franjo Wölfl (28)

This article shows statistics of individual players for the football club Dinamo Zagreb. It also lists all matches that Dinamo Zagreb played in the 1946–47 season, the first competitive season since the club's foundation in June 1945.

== Competitions ==
=== Preliminaries ===
In late 1945, only several months after the club's foundation in June, the regional qualifiers for what was to become the new national league championship were held. Dinamo first entered the Zagreb preliminaries, which were played in two eight-club groups in a single round-robin format, from October to December 1945. After topping their group with seven wins and a goal difference 40–5 Dinamo qualified for the local Zagreb Championship.

The eight-club Zagreb Championship was played from January to February 1946, and Dinamo again won the league with six wins and only one defeat in seven matches. Dinamo was equal on points with Lokomotiva, but progressed further thanks to superior goal difference (Dinamo's 41–8 vs Lokomotiva's 16–12).

Their triumph qualified them for the 1946 Croatian Football Championship, played by eight regional winners from SR Croatia. The league was played in a double round-robin format from May to August 1946, and it served as regional qualifier for the inaugural edition of the First Federal League, Yugoslavia's post-war national championship.

After 14 rounds, Dinamo finished second behind rivals Hajduk Split. Both clubs were equal on points, each recording ten wins, two draws and two defeats, but this time Hajduk had a superior goal difference (51–11) compared to Dinamo (40–12). Nevertheless, since the top two Croatian clubs were guaranteed a spot in the new Yugoslav championship, both Hajduk and Dinamo qualified.

=== First League ===
Managed by seasoned coach Márton Bukovi Dinamo played their first national league match on 25 August 1946, an away 2–2 draw with Budućnost played in Titograd. Their first home game was on 8 September 1946, a 0–1 defeat to Hajduk Split via a goal from Antun Lokošek.

In October, after five rounds had been played, two more clubs were added to what was originally a 12-team league. Kvarner joined the league, as representative of the military-administered Zone B, and weeks later Ponziana from Trieste was added to represent Zone A, from what was to become the Free Territory of Trieste. Because of this, the fixture list was rescheduled in late October.

By January and the winter break Dinamo have established themselves as one of the strongest clubs in Yugoslavia, with nine wins in the first 13 rounds, level on points with Hajduk and Red Star, with all three trailing first-placed Partizan, the newly established Yugoslav Army club, by only three points. The club's success was largely fueled by Franjo Wölfl, a prolific striker who scored 14 goals in 13 games in the first half of the season.

In the spring Bukovi left Zagreb to take over MTK in his native Hungary. He was replaced by interim player-manager Mirko Kokotović. The spring fixture list was determined via a draw, and under Kokotović Dinamo started strong, with three victories in four matches, including a win over their biggest Zagreb rivals Lokomotiva.

In March the Slovenian side Nafta Lendava abandoned the league after suffering 14 defeats in 17 rounds. FSJ therefore decided to record all of their remaining nine matches as 3–0 forfeits. After yet another loss to Hajduk in March, Dinamo remained undefeated until the end of season, recording seven wins and two draws, including a home 4–2 win vs Partizan and a home 2–2 draw with Red Star.

By July, Dinamo finished their first top-level season in history as runners-up, five points behind champions Partizan, and ahead of the other two members of the Yugoslav Big Four clubs, Red Star and Hajduk Split. Dinamo proved to be a tough opponent at home, losing only one league match in Zagreb, to Hajduk Split, in September 1946.

Wölfl became Yugoslav championship's first top scorer in the post-war era, having scored 28 goals in 23 matches (which included three braces, three hat-tricks, and one four-goal performance). Wölfl and player-manager Kokotović were also the club's most used players, each appearing in 23 out of 25 league games played.

=== Overview ===
Competition	First match	Last Match	Final position / round
1945 Zagreb Championship Qualifiers	21 October 1945	23 December 1945	Winners
1946 Zagreb Championship	13 January 1946	24 February 1946	Winners
1946 Croatian Championship	26 May 1946	18 August 1946	2nd place
1946–47 First Federal League	25 August 1946	6 July 1947	2nd place

== First Federal League ==
=== Results summary ===
Overall								Home						Away					
Pld	W	D	L	GF	GA	GD	Pts	W	D	L	GF	GA	GD	W	D	L	GF	GA	GD
26	19	4	3	81	26	+55	42	11	1	1	50	12	+38	8	3	2	31	14	+17

=== Matches ===
M	Date	Opponents	Venue	Result	Score F–A	Dinamo scorers	Attendance	Ref
1	25 August 1946	Budućnost	A	D	2–2	Kokotović 10', Beda 36'	4,530	
2	1 September 1946	Red Star	A	W	1–0	Reiss 59'	20,000	
3	8 September 1946	Hajduk Split	H	L	0–1		15,000	
4	15 September 1946	Lokomotiva	A	W	2–1	Wölfl 39', 49'	5,000	
5	22 September 1946	Željezničar	H	W	9–1	Cimermančić 3', 25', 43', Wölfl 16', 68', 80', 90', Senčar 27', Beda 75'	5,000	
6	27 October 1946	Partizan	A	L	1–5	Wölfl 30'	8,000	
7	3 November 1946	Metalac	H	W	3–1	Strugar 10', Lojen 11' (pen.), Wölfl 85'	8,000	
8	17 November 1946	Spartak Subotica	H	W	3–0	Senčar 13', Strugar 35', 45'	5,000	
9	24 November 1946	Železničar Niš	H	W	3–1	Wölfl 34', 38', 78'	4,000	
10	1 December 1946	Nafta Lendava	A	W	6–0	Wölfl 12', 20', Čajkovski 19', 53', Golob 22', Senčar 78'	700	
11	8 December 1946	Pobeda	A	D	0–0		6,000	
12	22 December 1946	Kvarner	A	W	3–1	Wölfl 44' (pen.), Senčar 53', Cimermančić 77'	5,000	
13	12 January 1947	Ponziana	A	W	4–0	Strugar 20', Wölfl 37', 69', Čajkovski 74'	7,000	
14	2 March 1947	Željezničar	A	W	3–1	Wölfl 25', Kacian 52', Senčar 61'	7,000	
15	9 March 1947	Kvarner	H	W	2–1	Lojen 31' (pen.), Čajkovski 35'	7,000	
16	16 March 1947	Hajduk Split	A	L	1–2	Strnad 30'	8,000	
17	23 March 1947	Lokomotiva	H	W	4–0	Čajkovski 8', 58', 66', Kacian 14'	10,000	
18	30 March 1947	Partizan	H	W	4–2	Strugar 17', 53', Pleše 25', Wölfl 59'	18,000	
19	13 April 1947	Spartak Subotica	A	D	1–1	Wölfl 49'	6,000	
20	20 April 1947	Nafta Lendava	H	W	3–0 (f)	Walkover		
21	27 April 1947	14. Oktobar	A	W	2–1	Jovanović 39' (o.g.), Cimermančić 53'	4,000	
24	18 May 1947	Pobeda	H	W	5–0	Cimermančić 4', Wölfl 25', 34', 74', Strugar 86'	4,000	
25	25 May 1947	Budućnost	H	W	7–1	Cimermančić 15' (pen.), Kacian 30', Strnad 31', Čajkovski 64', 76', Wölfl 75', 79'	6,000	
26	8 June 1947	Red Star	H	D	2–2	Cimermančić 7', Senčar 19'	20,000	
22	11 June 1947	Ponziana	H	W	5–2	Senčar 20', Cimermančić 28', 84', Wölfl 44' (pen.), Čajkovski 70'	2,000	
23	6 July 1947	Metalac	A	W	5–0	Wölfl 37', 67', 84', Reiss 57', Strugar 82'	3,000	

=== Classification ===
Pos	Team	Pld	W	D	L	GF	GA	GD	Pts
1	Partizan (C)	26	23	1	2	77	17	+60	47
2	Dinamo Zagreb	26	19	4	3	81	26	+55	42
3	Red Star Belgrade	26	18	2	6	66	23	+43	38
4	Hajduk Split	26	16	4	6	57	21	+36	36
5	Metalac Belgrade	26	13	3	10	40	35	+5	29

Source: RSSSF
(C) Champions

== Players ==
=== Squad statistics ===
Key

Pos = Playing position

Nat. = Nationality

DoB (Age) = Date of birth (age)

Apps = Appearances

GK = Goalkeeper

DF = Defender

MF = Midfielder

FW = Forward

Numbers indicate starting appearances + appearances as substitute.
Goals column shows total goals, numbers in brackets indicate penalty kicks scored.
Players with name struck through and marked † left the club during the playing season.
Age as of 25 August 1946, first matchday of the season.

Pos.	Nat.	Name	DoB (Age)	League	
Pos.	Nat.	Name	DoB (Age)	Apps	Goals
FW	(Socialist Federal Republic of Yugoslavia)	Franjo Wölfl	18 May 1918 (aged 28)	23	28
FW	(Socialist Federal Republic of Yugoslavia)	Mirko Kokotović	15 April 1913 (aged 33)	23	1
MF	(Socialist Federal Republic of Yugoslavia)	Đuka Strugar	25 March 1924 (aged 22)	22	8
DF	(Socialist Federal Republic of Yugoslavia)	Ivica Horvat	16 July 1926 (aged 20)	22	0
FW	(Socialist Federal Republic of Yugoslavia)	Zvonimir Cimermančić	26 August 1917 (aged 28)	20	10 (1)
DF	(Socialist Federal Republic of Yugoslavia)	Branko Pleše	20 January 1915 (aged 31)	20	1
FW	(Socialist Federal Republic of Yugoslavia)	Željko Čajkovski	5 May 1925 (aged 21)	18	10
FW	(Socialist Federal Republic of Yugoslavia)	Božidar Senčar	28 September 1927 (aged 18)	16	7
DF	(Socialist Federal Republic of Yugoslavia)	Dragutin Lojen	19 May 1919 (aged 27)	16	2 (2)
GK	(Socialist Federal Republic of Yugoslavia)	Zvonko Monsider	11 May 1920 (aged 26)	15	0
FW	(Socialist Federal Republic of Yugoslavia)	Ivica Reiss	9 May 1923 (aged 23)	14	2
GK/DF	(Socialist Federal Republic of Yugoslavia)	Drago Horvat	4 July 1924 (aged 22)	11	0
DF	(Socialist Federal Republic of Yugoslavia)	Mijo Etlinger	29 November 1923 (aged 22)	11	0
DF	(Socialist Federal Republic of Yugoslavia)	Slavko Beda	17 October 1919 (aged 26)	9	2
FW	(Socialist Federal Republic of Yugoslavia)	Vinko Golob	22 April 1921 (aged 25)	9	1
FW	(Socialist Federal Republic of Yugoslavia)	Ratko Kacian	18 January 1917 (aged 29)	8	3
FW	(Socialist Federal Republic of Yugoslavia)	Zvonko Strnad	15 January 1926 (aged 20)	7	2
FW	(Socialist Federal Republic of Yugoslavia)	Vilim Medved	8 April 1926 (aged 20)	4	0
GK	(Socialist Federal Republic of Yugoslavia)	Zvonko Dogan	b. 1921	4	0
DF	(Socialist Federal Republic of Yugoslavia)	Marko Jurić	14 August 1924 (aged 22)	3	0
