= 1942 Croatian First League =

The Croatian First League season of 1942 was the second held in the Independent State of Croatia. Regional group stages were carried out, before a playoff system began. Concordia Zagreb was declared champion.

== Group A ==
Pos	Team	Pld	W	D	L	GF	GA	GD	Pts
1	HŠK Građanski Zagreb	4	4	0	0	19	4	+15	8
2	HŠK Bata Borovo	4	2	0	2	7	12	−5	4
3	HŠK Željezničar Zagreb	4	0	0	4	3	13	−10	0

Source: rsssf.org

== Group B ==
Pos	Team	Pld	W	D	L	GF	GA	GD	Pts
1	HŠK Concordia Zagreb	4	2	1	1	7	5	+2	5
2	HAŠK Zagreb	4	1	2	1	7	5	+2	4
3	HRŠK Zagorac Varaždin	4	1	1	2	5	9	−4	3

Source: rsssf.org

== Group C ==
Pos	Team	Pld	W	D	L	GF	GA	GD	Pts
1	HŠK Hajduk Osijek	8	6	1	1	19	5	+14	13
2	HŠK Građanski Osijek	8	4	3	1	15	8	+7	11
3	HŠK Radnik Osijek	8	4	2	2	14	10	+4	10
4	HŠK Građanski Zemun	8	1	2	5	8	14	−6	4
5	DSV Victoria Zemun	8	1	0	7	3	22	−19	2

Source: rsssf.org

== Group D ==
Pos	Team	Pld	W	D	L	GF	GA	GD	Pts
1	SAŠK Sarajevo	8	6	1	1	24	8	+16	11 (Note: 2 points deducted?)
2	HŠK Zrinjski Mostar	8	4	2	2	14	9	+5	10
3	HŠK Hrvoje Banja Luka	8	3	2	3	11	10	+1	8
4	HŠK Gjerzelez Sarajevo	8	1	4	3	6	10	−4	6
5	HBŠK Banja Luka	8	0	3	5	4	22	−18	3

Source: rsssf.org

== Semifinals ==
- HŠK Concordia Zagreb - SAŠK Sarajevo: 2-1, 9-1
- HŠK Gradjanski Zagreb - HŠK Hajduk Osijek: 5-1, 1-3

== Finals ==
- HŠK Concordia Zagreb - HŠK Gradjanski Zagreb: 6-2, 1-3

== Champions ==
Concordia Zagreb (Coach: Bogdan Cuvaj)
Zvonko Monsider
Toni Krammer
Branko Pavisa
Krešimir Pukšec
Slavko Pavletic
Zvonko Jazbec
Slavko Beda
Vinko Golob
Karlo Muradori
Slavko Kodrnja
Viktor Ajbek
