= 1944 Croatian First League =

This article gives statistics of the Croatian First League in association football in the 1944 season.

== First stage ==
=== City of Zagreb championship ===
Pos	Team	Pld	W	D	L	GF	GA	GD	Pts
1	1. HŠK Građanski Zagreb	14	10	4	0	53	10	+43	24
2	HŠK Concordia Zagreb	14	9	2	3	37	16	+21	20
3	HAŠK Zagreb	14	7	3	4	45	18	+27	17
4	HŠK Željezničar Zagreb	14	8	1	5	30	16	+14	17
5	HŠK Ferraria Zagreb	14	6	2	6	25	29	−4	14
6	HSK Ličanin Zagreb	14	3	3	8	27	38	−11	9
7	HRŠK Zagorac Varaždin	14	3	2	9	15	36	−21	8
8	HŠK Victoria Zagreb	14	1	1	12	11	80	−69	3

Source: rsssf.org

=== Provincial Zagreb championship ===
- 1 : HSK Segesta Sisak

==== Zagreb play-offs ====
- HSK Zeljeznicar Zagreb – HSK Segesta Sisak

=== City of Osijek championship ===
- 1 : HSK Gradjanski Osijek
- 2 : HSK Hajduk Osijek
- 3 : HSK Radnik Osijek
- 4 : HSK Olimpija Osijek
- 5 : HSK Graficar Osijek
- 6 : DSV Germania Osijek

=== Provincial Osijek championship ===
- 1 : HSK Borovo
- 2 : HSK Cibalia Vinkovci
- 3 : HSK Sparta Vukovar

==== Osijek play-offs ====
===== Round 1 =====
- HSK Gradjanski Osijek 7–0; ?-? HSK Sparta Vukovar
- HSK Borovo 4–2; 0–1 HSK Cibalia Vinkovci

===== Round 2 =====
- HSK Hajduk Osijek 3–2; 0–2 HSK Radnik Osijek
- HSK Borovo 2–1; ?-? HSK Gradjanski Osijek

===== Round 3 =====
- HSK Borovo 2–1; 0–0 HSK Radnik Osijek

=== City of Zemun championship ===
- 1 : HSK Dunav Zemun
- 2 : HSK Gradjanski Zemun
- 3 : SK Liet Zemun
- 4 : HSK Hajduk Zemun

==== Zemun play-offs ====
- HŠK Građanski Zemun – HŠK Dunav Zemun

=== City of Banja Luka championship ===
- 1 : HBSK Banja Luka
- 2 : HSK Zvonimir Banja Luka
- 3 : HSK Hrvoje Banja Luka

=== City of Sarajevo ===
- 1 : SASK Sarajevo
- 2 : HSK Hajduk Sarajevo
- 3 : HSK Gjerzelez Sarajevo

=== Provincial Sarajevo ===
- 1 : HSK Tomislav Zenica

==== Sarajevo play-offs ====
===== Round 1 =====
- SASK Sarajevo – HSK Tomislav Zenica
- HSK Gjerzelez Sarajevo – HSK Hajduk Sarajevo

===== Round 2 =====
- SASK Sarajevo – HSK Gjerzelez Sarajevo

==== Banja Luka / Sarajevo play-offs ====
- SASK Sarajevo – HBSK Banja Luka

== Second Stage ==
=== Group Zagreb ===
Pos	Team	Pld	W	D	L	GF	GA	GD	Pts
1	HASK Zagreb	6	5	0	1	7	3	+4	10
2	1. HSK Gradjanski Zagreb	6	4	0	2	10	5	+5	8
3	HSK Zeljeznicar Zagreb	6	2	0	4	4	7	−3	4
4	HSK Concordia Zagreb	6	1	0	5	3	9	−6	2

Source: rsssf.org

=== Group Provincial ===
==== Semifinals ====
- HSK Gradjanski Zemun 0–2; 0–3 HSK Borovo

==== Finals ====
- HSK Borovo 0–1; 0–3 SASK Sarajevo

== Final ==
- HASK Zagreb – SASK Sarajevo
