= HŠK Hajduk Zemun =

- Full name: Hrvatski športski klub Hajduk Zemun
- Founded: before 1939
- Dissolved: after 1945

HŠK Hajduk (Croatian: Hrvatski športski klub "Hajduk") was a football club from Zemun (nowadays Serbia). Local Croats from Zemun and other parts of Syrmia gathered around this club.

== Name ==
Its name literally means Croatian Sports Club "Hajduk".

== History ==
The squad competed in the football championship of Independent State of Croatia. After the end of Second World War, that circumstance was used to ban the work of this football club and disband it, as it was the case with other clubs that competed in the championship of Independent State of Croatia.

In the unfinished Croatian championship 1944, in the group stage (City of Zemun championship), Hajduk took the last place in the group, behind Dunav, Građanski and Liet, and ended the competition.

== Sources ==
- (in English) Croatia Domestic Football Full Tables
