= DSV Victoria Zemun =

Football club

Deutscher Sportverein Victoria was a football club from Zemun (nowadays Serbia), Belgrade. Local Germans from Zemun and other parts of Syrmia mainly played for the club.

== History ==
This squad was founded before 1939, and competed in the unfinished 1941 football championship of the Independent State of Croatia.

In that season, the club took 8th place, the penultimate position. In the 1942 Croatian First League, Victoria ended the competition in the first group stage. Victoria finished last in Group C, behind squads from Osijek Hajduk, HŠK Građanski Osijek, Radnik Osijek and city rival Građanski.

After the end of the Second World War, the club was disbanded, as it was the case with other clubs that competed in the championship of wartime Croatia.
