= Karlo Muradori =

Croatian footballer

Personal information
- Date of birth: 1914
- Place of birth: Drvar, Austro-Hungary
- Date of death: 1971 (aged 56–57)
- Place of death: Zagreb, SFR Yugoslavia
- Position: Forward

Senior career*
| Years | Team | Apps | (Gls) |
| 1933–1938 | SAŠK | | |
| 1937–1945 | Concordia Zagreb | | |
| 1945–1946 | Sloboda Zagreb | | |
| 1947–1948 | Lokomotiva Zagreb | | |

Managerial career
- Maksimir
- * Club domestic league appearances and goals

Karlo Muradori was a Croatian football midfielder. He won the 1942 Croatian championship with Concordia Zagreb.
