= 1933 Turkish Football Championship =

Tournament details
- Country: Turkey
- Dates: 13 October – 10 November
- Teams: 18

Final positions
- Champions: Fenerbahçe (1st Turkish title)
- Runners-up: İzmirspor

Tournament statistics
- Top goal scorer(s): Zeki Rıza Sporel (10 goals)

The 1933 Turkish Football Championship was the fourth edition of the competition. It was held in October. Fenerbahçe won their first national championship title in their history by defeating İzmirspor 8–0 in the replay of the final match. In the initial final match between Fenerbahçe and İzmirspor the latter were leading 1–0 in the first half. In the second half the referee awarded Fenerbahçe a penalty, which led to persistent protests of İzmirspor players. Eventually, İzmirspor supporters invaded the pitch and the match was aborted. The Turkish Football Federation decided that the replay was to be played on the home ground of the club which would be selected by draw and that a foreign referee would be assigned.

The 1933 final produced the most goals scored in a final during the history of the competition, exceeding the six scored in the 1927 final. The various regional champions competed in a group stage of five groups of three or four teams each, with the group winners qualifying for the final stage.

== Group stage ==
=== Çukurova Group ===
==== Round 1 ====
18 October 1933	Antalya	1 – 2	Diyarbakır Ayspor	Adana
15:00				Stadium: Şehir Stadium; Referee: Adni Bey

- Mersin İdman Yurdu received a bye for the group final.

==== Group final ====
20 October 1933	Mersin İdman Yurdu	1 – 3	Diyarbakır Ayspor	Adana
				Stadium: Şehir Stadium; Referee: Reşit Bey

- Diyarbakır Ayspor won the group and qualified for the final stage.

=== Western Anatolia Group ===
==== Round 1 ====
13 October 1933	İzmirspor	4 – 2	Balıkesir İdman Yurdu	Balıkesir
13:15				Stadium: General Ali Hikmet Stadium; Referee: Kemal Halim Gürgen

13 October 1933	Uşak Gençlerbirliği	4 – 2	Manisa İdman Yurdu	Balıkesir
				Stadium: General Ali Hikmet Stadium; Referee: Hamit Bey

==== Group final ====
16 October 1933	Uşak Gençlerbirliği	0 – 8	İzmirspor	Balıkesir
				Stadium: General Ali Hikmet Stadium

- İzmirspor won the group and qualified for the final stage.

=== Black Sea Group ===
==== Round 1 ====
15 October 1933	Samsun Halkspor	5 – 1	Giresun	Trabzon
				Stadium: İnönü Stadium

- Trabzon İdman Ocağı received a bye for the group final.

==== Group final ====
17 October 1933	Trabzon İdman Ocağı	7 – 0	Samsun Halkspor	Trabzon
				Stadium: İnönü Stadium; Referee: Nuri Bosut

- Trabzon İdman Ocağı won the group and qualified for the final stage.

=== Marmara Group ===
==== Round 1 ====
20 October 1933	Bursa San'atkâran	5 – 2	Çanakkale Türkgücü	Bursa
13:00				Stadium: Bursa Gazi Stadium; Referee: Kemal Rıfat Kalpakçıoğlu

20 October 1933	Fenerbahçe	12 – 0	Adapazarı İdman Yurdu	Bursa
15:00	Mehmet Reşat Nayır 11', 73', 79'; Fikret Arıcan 23' (pen.); Zeki Rıza Sporel 33', 58', 75', 88'; Muzaffer Çizer 46', 89'; Niyazi Sel 71', 86'	Report		Stadium: Bursa Gazi Stadium; Referee: Kemal Rıfat Kalpakçıoğlu

==== Group final ====
21 October 1933	Bursa San'atkâran	forfeit^{1}	Fenerbahçe	Bursa
		Report		Stadium: Bursa Gazi Stadium

- ^{1} Bursa San'atkâran forfeited. Fenerbahçe were awarded the win and qualified for the final stage.

=== Central Anatolia Group ===
==== Round 1 ====
20 October 1933	Eskişehir İdman Yurdu	3 – 2	Konya İdman Yurdu	Ankara
				Stadium: İstiklal Sahası; Referee: Muhip Bey

20 October 1933	Gençlerbirliği Ankara	4 – 1	Kütahya Türkspor	Ankara
		Report		Stadium: İstiklal Sahası

==== Group final ====
22 October 1933	Gençlerbirliği Ankara	6 – 0	Eskişehir İdman Yurdu	Ankara
		Report		Stadium: İstiklal Sahası

- Gençlerbirliği Ankara won the group and qualified for the final stage.

== Final stage ==
=== Round 1 ===
25 October 1933

Gençlerbirliği Ankara	1 – 4	Fenerbahçe
27'	Report	Zeki Rıza Sporel 30'; Fikret Arıcan 40'; Niyazi Sel 70'; Şaban Topkanlı 80'

İstiklal Sahası, Ankara
Referee: Nuri Bosut
26 October 1933

İzmirspor	7 – 0	Diyarbakır Ayspor

İstiklal Sahası, Ankara
Referee: Kemal Halim Gürgen
- Trabzon İdman Ocağı received a bye for the semi-final.

=== Semi-final ===
27 October 1933
14:45

Fenerbahçe	3 – 0	Trabzon İdman Ocağı
Zeki Rıza Sporel 24', 26', 88'	Report

İstiklal Sahası, Ankara
Referee: Nuri Bosut
- İzmirspor received a bye for the final.

=== Final ===
10 November 1933
14:30

İzmirspor	0 – 8	Fenerbahçe
	Report	Fikret Arıcan 20'; Zeki Rıza Sporel 30', 72'; Şaban Topkanlı 46', 75'; Muzaffer Çizer 58'; Niyazi Sel 61'; Reşat 68' (o.g.)

Alsancak Stadium, İzmir
Attendance: 7,000
Referee: M. Meitz (Austria)

== Gallery ==
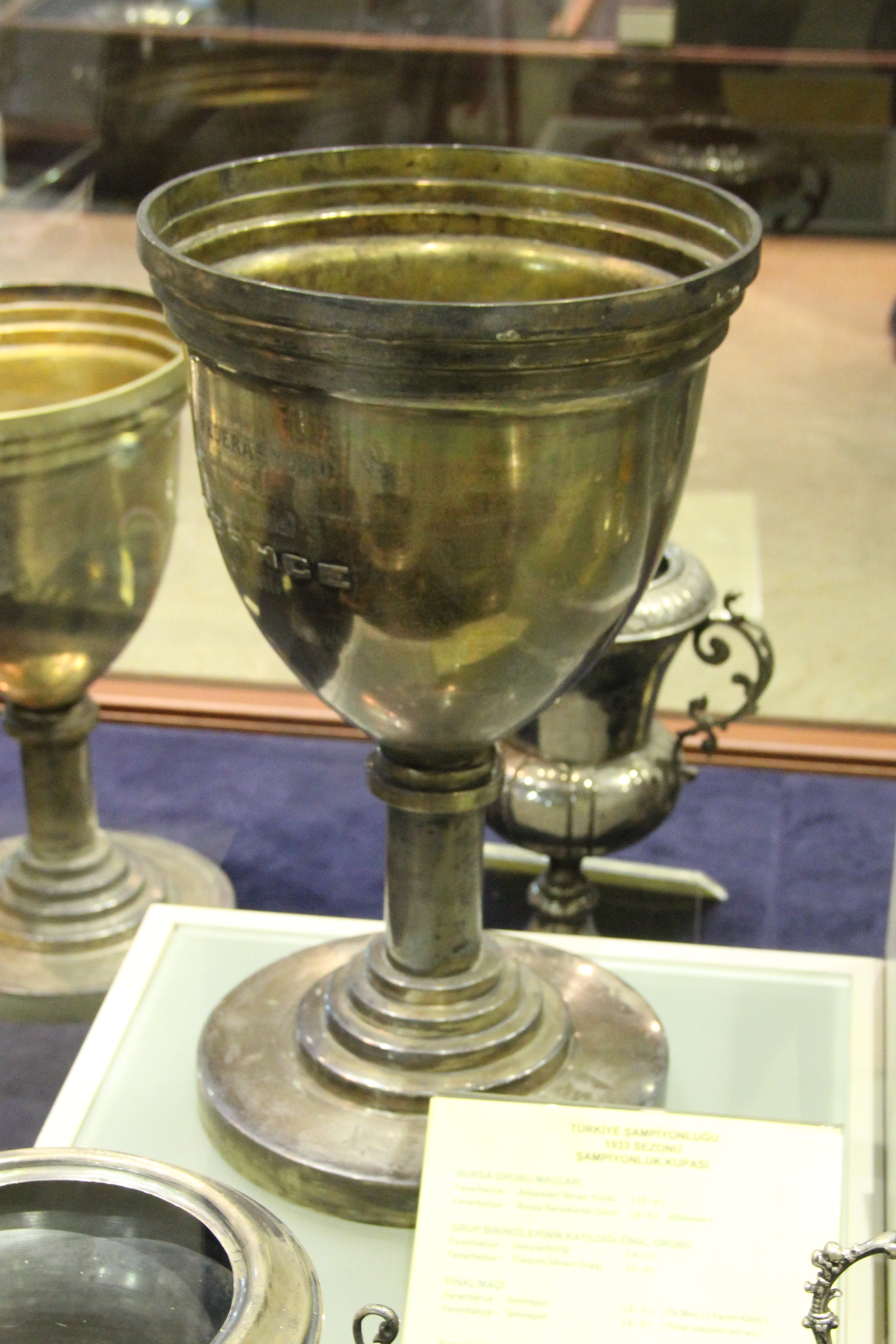
The 1933 Turkish Championship trophy won by Fenerbahçe is displayed in the club's own museum
