= Zvonko Monsider =

Croatian footballer

Personal information
- Full name: Zvonimir Monsider
- Date of birth: 11 May 1920
- Place of birth: Zagreb, Kingdom of Serbs, Croats and Slovenes
- Date of death: 16 March 1997 (aged 77)
- Place of death: Crystal River, Florida, U.S.
- Position: Goalkeeper

Senior career*
| Years | Team | Apps | (Gls) |
| 1938–1939 | Ferraria Zagreb | | |
| 1939–1945 | Concordia | | |
| 1945–1948 | Dinamo Zagreb | 45 | (0) |
| 1948-1949 | Lazio | 0 | (0) |
| 1949 | → Padova (loan) | 7 | (0) |
| 1950 | Hungaria Roma | | |
| 1951–1952 | Deportivo Samarios | | |

International career
| 1942–1943 | Independent State of Croatia | 6 | (0) |
| 1946–1947 | Yugoslavia | 7 | (0) |

Managerial career
- 1953–1955: Sabadell
- 1956–1957: Barakaldo
- 1957: Sants
- 1957–1958: Terrassa
- 1958–1959: L'Hospitalet
- * Club domestic league appearances and goals

Zvonko Monsider was a Croatian football goalkeeper. He played for both the Croatian and Yugoslavian national teams.

== Playing career ==
=== Club ===
He started his career with Ferraria Zagreb before moving to Concordia Zagreb in 1939. He played with Concordia until the establishment of the new regime club Dinamo Zagreb. Monsider was one of three Concordia players to move to the new club (along with Vinko Golob and Slavko Beda).

=== International ===
He made his debut for the Independent State of Croatia, a World War II-era puppet state of Nazi Germany, in a June 1942 friendly match away against Slovakia and played 6 games for that team, scoring no goals. After the war he played for Yugoslavia, collecting another 7 caps and his final international was a September 1947 Balkan Cup match away against Albania.

== Managerial career ==
He later became a manager with Sabadell, Barakaldo CF, UE Sants, Terrassa FC, CE L'Hospitalet.
