= Slavko Kodrnja =

Yugoslav Croat footballer (1911–1970)

Personal information
- Full name: Slavoljub Kodrnja
- Date of birth: 1911
- Place of birth: Zagreb, Austria-Hungary
- Date of death: 1970 (aged 58–59)
- Place of death: Zagreb, SFR Yugoslavia
- Position: Forward

Senior career*
| Years | Team | Apps | (Gls) |
| 1932–1936 | Concordia Zagreb | | |
| 1936–1937 | Young Boys | | |
| 1937–1938 | Saint-Étienne | 21 | (9) |
| 1938–1939 | FC Antibes | 26 | (7) |
| 1939 | Sochaux | 0 | (0) |
| 1939–1940 | Porto | 18 | (29) |
| 1940–1943 | Concordia Zagreb | | |

International career
| 1933 | Yugoslavia | 4 | (4) |
| 1942–1943 | Independent State of Croatia | 2 | (0) |

Managerial career
- Concordia Zagreb
- Olimpija Ljubljana
- Branik Maribor
- Lokomotiva Zagreb
- Kvarner Rijeka
- Borac Banja Luka
- Raufoss IL
- Ethiopia
- Mura
- * Club domestic league appearances and goals

Slavko Kodrnja (1911–1970) was a footballer who played as a forward. Internationally, he played for Yugoslavia and the Independent State of Croatia.

== Club career ==
In the 1940–41 season of the Portuguese league, he was the top scorer, tied with Fernando Peyroteo. He won the 1942 Croatian championship with Concordia Zagreb.

== International career ==
Kodrnja made his debut for Yugoslavia during the 1933 Balkan Cup match against Greece, immediately scoring a hat-trick. He made a total of four appearances for Yugoslavia, and also scored four goals. However, with the establishment of the Independent State of Croatia, a World War II-era puppet state of Nazi Germany, he began playing for the Croatia national team in 1942. His final international was an April 1943 friendly match against Slovakia.

== Honours ==
=== Player ===
Concordia Zagreb

- Kingdom of Yugoslavia First League: 1931–32
- Croatian First League: 1942

Porto

- Primeira Divisão: 1939–40

=== Individual ===
- Bola de Prata: 1939–40

=== Manager ===
Borac Banja Luka

- Yugoslav Third League: 1952–53

Ethiopia

- African Cup of Nations silver medal: 1957
- African Cup of Nations bronze medal: 1959
