= Mirko Kokotović =

Croatian footballer

Personal information
- Full name: Miroslav Kokotović
- Date of birth: 15 April 1913
- Place of birth: Lukavac, Austria-Hungary
- Date of death: 15 November 1988 (aged 75)
- Place of death: Zagreb, Yugoslavia
- Position: Left winger

Youth career
- 1926–1929: Maksimir
- 1929: 1. HŠK Građanski

Senior career*
Years	Team	Apps	(Gls)
1929–1945	1. HŠK Građanski	222	(52)
1945–1948	Dinamo Zagreb	51	(5)

International career
1931–1939	Yugoslavia	23	(4)
1940	Banovina of Croatia	3	(0)
1941–1944	Independent State of Croatia	12	(2)

Managerial career
- 1947: Dinamo Zagreb (player-manager)
- Lokomotiva Zagreb
- Varteks
- HNK Segesta
- Kozara Slavonski Brod
- 1958–1959: Odred Ljubljana
- 1959–1962: Borac Banja Luka
- 1962–1964: Fenerbahçe
- 1964–1965: AEK Athens
- 1965–1966: Diagoras
- 1966–1967: Velež Mostar
- 1969–1970: Austria Klagenfurt
- * Club domestic league appearances and goals

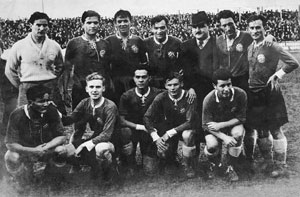
Građanski lineup that won the 1937 Kingdom of Yugoslavia championship. Standing (left to right): Urch, Jazbinšek, Hügl, Jozo Jakopić (secretary), Kovačević, Kokotović. Sitting (left to right) Danić, Lešnik, Antolković, Pleše, Medarić.

Mirko Kokotović (Croatian pronunciation: [mǐːrko kokǒːtoʋitɕ]; 15 April 1913 – 15 November 1988) was a Bosnian/Croatian footballer who played international football for Yugoslavia.

== Club career ==
He became national champion of the Kingdom of Yugoslavia with Građanski Zagreb in 1937 and 1940. During World War II he continued to play for Građanski, and after the war he joined the newly established Dinamo Zagreb, where he was one of the key players in the period from 1945 to 1948, and even acted as player-manager in the 1946–47 season.

During his time at Dinamo he played alongside other club greats such as Franjo Wölfl, Zvonimir Cimermančić, Željko Čajkovski, Ivica Horvat, Ratko Kacian and Ivan Jazbinšek.

After retiring from active playing in 1948 he managed a series of lower-tier clubs around Croatia and Yugoslavia, and in the early 1960s he went abroad and had managing stints at Fenerbahçe in Turkey. On 29 June 1964 signed for AEK Athens in Greece, where he stayed for one season. On 14 July 1965 he moved to Diagoras for another season. His last managing job was at Austria Klagenfurt in 1969–70.

== International career ==
His international career in Yugoslavia lasted from 1931 to 1939 during which he was capped 23 times, scoring four goals. Just before World War II he played four matches for the Banovina of Croatia team, which was a province within the Kingdom of Yugoslavia. With the establishment of the wartime Independent State of Croatia in 1941, which was allied with Axis powers, Kokotović also played for its national team, earning 12 caps and scoring 2 goals in friendlies against other Axis national teams.
