= Zeki Rıza Sporel =

Turkish footballer and politician (1898–1969)

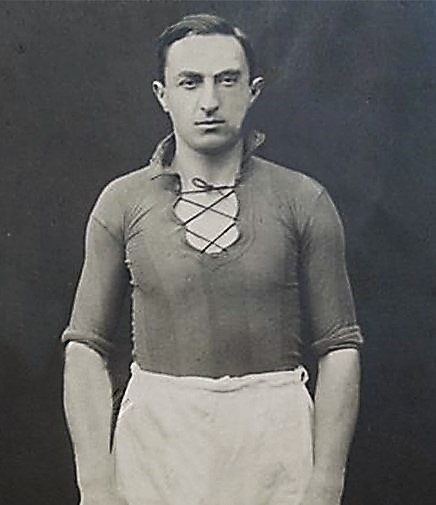

Personal information
- Date of birth: 28 February 1898
- Place of birth: Istanbul, Ottoman Empire
- Date of death: 3 November 1969 (aged 71)
- Place of death: Turkey
- Position: Striker

Youth career
- 1912–1915: Fenerbahçe

Senior career*
| Years | Team | Apps | (Gls) |
| 1915–1934 | Fenerbahçe | 352 | (470) |

International career
| 1923–1934 | Turkey | 16 | (15) |
- * Club domestic league appearances and goals

Zeki Rıza Sporel (28 February 1898 – 3 November 1969) was a Turkish football player and a politician. He plied his trade at the striker position for Fenerbahçe and the Turkey national football team. His career started in the Fenerbahçe youth teams until he was promoted to the senior team. Zeki spent his entire career with the club, setting numerous records. He was also a forerunner for Turkey, becoming the first player to score for the team. He is often cited as one of the best strikers in Turkish football history. He was also active in politics as he became a member of the Democrat Party in 1946.

Zeki Rıza was the younger brother of Hasan Kamil Sporel who both played for and served as president of Fenerbahçe S.K.

== Club career ==
Born in Istanbul in 1898, Zeki's career began in the Fenerbahçe youth system, where he spent three years. He was promoted to the senior squad during the 1915–16 season at the age of eighteen. His left foot was dominant, as he scarcely used his right foot and his head. Zeki set many scoring records at Fenerbahçe, including most goals in a single match, and fastest goal. On 13 February 1931, Zeki scored a record eight goals in a match as Fenerbahçe won 16–0 against Üsküdar Anadolu. His prolific goal-scoring ability led him to be affectionately named Üstad (The Master). The entirety of his career was spent at Fenerbahçe, retiring in 1934 after eighteen years of service. Zeki's final goal record was 470 goals in 352 matches. If you include the goals from the national team, Istanbul Select and other club selects his total would reach to over 800.

== International career ==
A member of the first Turkey national team, Zeki played and scored in the country's first international match against Romania. He rounded off the performance with a second goal in the other half. Winning sixteen caps, Zeki led the team ten times while scoring 15 goals. He also played for Turkey at the 1924 Summer Olympics and the 1928 Summer Olympics.

== Career statistics ==
=== International goals ===
| # | Date | Venue | Opponent | Score | Result | Competition |
|---|---|---|---|---|---|---|
| 1. | 26 October 1923 | Taksim Stadium, Istanbul, Turkey | Romania | 2–2 | Draw | Friendly |
| 2. | 26 October 1923 | Taksim Stadium, Istanbul, Turkey | Romania | 2–2 | Draw | Friendly |
| 3. | 17 June 1924 | Töölön Pallokenttä, Helsinki, Finland | Finland | 2–4 | Win | Friendly |
| 4. | 17 June 1924 | Töölön Pallokenttä, Helsinki, Finland | Finland | 2–4 | Win | Friendly |
| 5. | 17 June 1924 | Töölön Pallokenttä, Helsinki, Finland | Finland | 2–4 | Win | Friendly |
| 6. | 17 June 1924 | Töölön Pallokenttä, Helsinki, Finland | Finland | 2–4 | Win | Friendly |
| 7. | 19 June 1924 | Reval Stadium (Kalevi aed), Tallinn, Estonia | Estonia | 1–4 | Win | Friendly |
| 8. | 19 June 1924 | Reval Stadium (Kalevi aed), Tallinn, Estonia | Estonia | 1–4 | Win | Friendly |
| 9. | 22 June 1924 | LSB Stadions, Riga, Latvia | Latvia | 1–3 | Win | Friendly |
| 10. | 22 June 1924 | LSB Stadions, Riga, Latvia | Latvia | 1–3 | Win | Friendly |
| 11. | 22 June 1924 | LSB Stadions, Riga, Latvia | Latvia | 1–3 | Win | Friendly |
| 12. | 1 May 1925 | Stadionul Romcomit, Bucharest, Romania | Romania | 1–2 | Win | Friendly |
| 13. | 2 October 1925 | Taksim Stadium, Istanbul, Turkey | Poland | 1–2 | Lost | Friendly |
| 14. | 14 October 1927 | Taksim Stadium, Istanbul, Turkey | Bulgaria | 3–1 | Win | Friendly |
| 15. | 14 October 1927 | Taksim Stadium, Istanbul, Turkey | Bulgaria | 3–1 | Win | Friendly |
Correct as of 10 February 2010

== Honours ==
- Turkish Football Championship (1): 1933
- Istanbul Football League (4): 1920–21, 1922–23, 1929–30, 1932–33
- Istanbul Friday League (2): 1920–21, 1922–23
- Istanbul Shield (1): 1930
- General Harrington Cup (1): 1923

== Political career ==
After retiring from football Sporel joined the Democrat Party. He was also among the directors of the Party newspaper Zafer.

== See also ==
- List of one-club men
