= Burhan Sargun =

Turkish footballer (1929–2023)

Personal information
- Date of birth: 11 February 1929
- Place of birth: Ankara, Turkey
- Date of death: 15 September 2023 (aged 94)
- Position: Forward

Senior career*
Years	Team	Apps	(Gls)
- Fenerbahçe

International career
1953–1954	Turkey	8	(7)
- * Club domestic league appearances and goals

Burhan Cahit Sargun (11 February 1929 – 15 September 2023) was a Turkish footballer who played as a forward.

Sargun was born in Ankara. During his club career he played for Fenerbahçe between 1951–56 and 1960–61, scoring a total of 112 goals. He played eight games and scored seven goals for the Turkey national team, including a hat-trick in the 1954 FIFA World Cup against South Korea.

Sargun died on 15 September 2023, at the age of 94. One day later, he was buried at Karacaahmet Cemetery.
