= Mihail Lozanov =

Bulgarian footballer

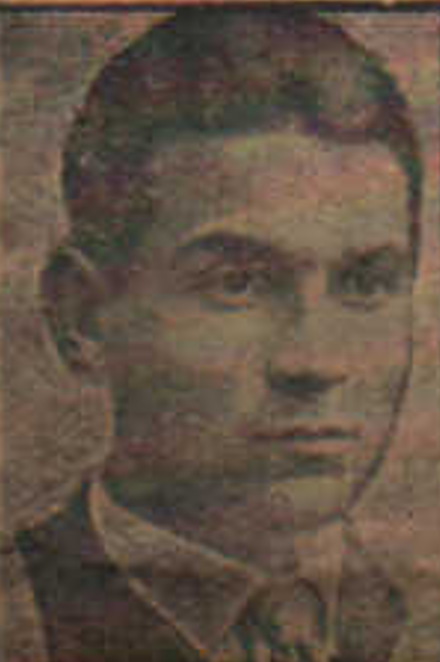

Personal information
- Date of birth: 15 June 1911
- Place of birth: Lyulin, Kingdom of Bulgaria
- Date of death: 3 December 1994 (aged 83)
- Place of death: Pernik, Bulgaria
- Position: Forward

Youth career
- ?: SC Krakra Pernik

Senior career*
Years	Team	Apps	(Gls)
1930–1937	Levski Sofia	59	(39)
1935	SK Moravská Slavia Brno	?	(?)
1937–1939	Bayern Munich	18	(7)
1939–1941	Levski Sofia	20	(4)

International career
1931–1939	Bulgaria	38	(10)
- * Club domestic league appearances and goals

Mihail Lozanov (Bulgarian: Михаил Лозанов; 15 June 1911 – 3 December 1994), nicknamed The Tank (Танка, Tanka) was a Bulgarian footballer. A centre forward, Lozanov was a long-time player of PFC Levski Sofia in the 1930s and captained FC Bayern Munich in 1937–39, which makes him the only Bulgarian who ever captained the largest German club.

== Club career ==
Born in the village of Tsarnel (today Lyulin) near Pernik in 1911, Lozanov started playing football at SC Krakra Pernik at age nine. The club had been newly co-founded by his brother Todor Lozanov. When he moved to the capital Sofia to attend high school, he transferred to powerhouse PFC Levski Sofia in 1930, where he spent most of his career. At Levski, Lozanov formed a formidable attacking trio with teammates Asen Panchev and Asen Peshev and scored 43 goals in 79 league games. Lozanov's attacking prowess earned him the nickname The Tank; reportedly, he once shattered the crossbar with a powerful shot. With Levski, Lozanov won the Bulgarian State Football Championship twice, in 1933 and 1937. These were Levski's first two championship titles.

As a student in Brno, Czechoslovakia in 1935, Lozanov played for local side SK Moravská Slavia. Then, Lozanov moved to Munich in Nazi Germany to continue his education as a civil engineer at the Munich Polytechnic School. In Munich, Lozanov represented and captained FC Bayern Munich, the most successful club in German history. Lozanov was a regular first team player in the Gauliga Bayern between 1937 and 1939, featuring for Bayern Munich alongside German internationals Ludwig Goldbrunner, Jakob Streitle and Wilhelm Simetsreiter.

Returning to Bulgaria, Lozanov continued his career at Levski Sofia for two more years until retiring from football in 1941 at age 30. In his later years, he was a mining engineer in Pernik.

== International career ==
Mihail Lozanov was among the stars of the Bulgaria national football team in the 1930s. He debuted against Yugoslavia in a 0–1 loss in 1931 and played his last game against Germany in a 1–2 loss in 1939. In between, Lozanov won the Balkan Cup twice with Bulgaria, in 1932 and 1935. He also took part in the 1934 FIFA World Cup qualification cycle. For the national team, Lozanov recorded a total of 38 caps and 10 goals.

== Honours ==
- Bulgarian State Football Championship: 2
  - 1933
  - 1937
- Balkan Cup: 2
  - 1932
  - 1935
- Bulgarian Olympic Committee Cup: 1
  - 1931
