= 1946 Croatian Football Championship =

The 1946 Croatian Football Championship was a two-stage competition for clubs from PR Croatia. It served as a qualifying tournament for the new post-war First League in communist Yugoslavia, and its inaugural 1946–47 edition.

Croatia, one of six republics in the newly formed Yugoslavia, was given two places in the new national league. Eight clubs earned a spot in the final stage through a series of regional preliminaries and playoffs. In this stage, they played each other twice in a 14-round double round-robin format.

Hajduk Split won the final stage on goal difference in front of runners-up Dinamo Zagreb. Both clubs qualified to play in the Yugoslav top level in the 1946–47 season. A third Croatian club, Lokomotiva, which had finished second in the Zagreb qualifying tournament, also earned a spot in the 1946–47 national league via additional inter-regional qualifiers, in which they reached the final and lost to Belgrade-based club Metalac.

A separate qualifying tournament was organized for clubs from the newly acquired territories of Istria and the city of Rijeka (Fiume). The newly established SD Kvarner (also known as "SCF Quarnero" in Italian) from Rijeka won a playoff against US Operaia from Pula to represent the military-administered Zone B, in the Julian March. A club from Trieste, representing Zone A, Ponziana, was also later added directly to the Yugoslav national league.

Regional qualifiers were played early in the year, and the final stage was played between May and August. The three Croatian clubs thus joined the first 12-club season of the Yugoslav league championship, which kicked off in late August 1946. (Kvarner and Ponziana were two additional clubs which joined mid-season, in October 1946, after five rounds had already been played.)

== City of Zagreb preliminaries "A" ==
Pos	Team	Pld	W	D	L	GF	GA	GD	Pts
1	FD Lokomotiva Zagreb	7	6	0	1	20	4	+16	12
2	Narodna obrana	7	5	1	1	23	9	+14	11
3	FD Tekstilac Zagreb	7	4	1	2	31	8	+23	9
4	32 divizija	7	4	1	2	21	7	+14	9
5	FD Poštar Zagreb	7	3	2	2	16	11	+5	8
6	FD Jedinstvo Zagreb	7	2	1	4	13	20	−7	5
7	Slaven Kustošija	7	1	0	6	5	24	−19	2
8	FD Milicija Zagreb	7	0	0	7	0	46	−46	0

Source: rsssf.org

== City of Zagreb preliminaries "B" ==
Pos	Team	Pld	W	D	L	GF	GA	GD	Pts
1	FD Dinamo	7	7	0	0	40	5	+35	14
2	FD Metalac	7	6	0	1	19	6	+13	12
3	II armija	7	5	0	2	39	6	+33	10
4	FD Dubrava	7	3	1	3	16	11	+5	7
5	FD Element	7	2	1	4	14	16	−2	5
6	FD Amater	7	2	1	4	14	29	−15	5
7	FD Grafičar	7	1	0	6	2	37	−35	2
8	FD Građevinar	7	0	1	6	4	38	−34	1

Source: rsssf.org

== City of Zagreb championship ==
Pos	Team	Pld	W	D	L	GF	GA	GD	Pts
1	FD Dinamo	7	6	0	1	41	8	+33	12
2	FD Lokomotiva	7	6	0	1	16	12	+4	12
3	FD Metalac	7	4	1	2	15	8	+7	9
4	FD Amater	7	3	1	3	14	17	−3	7
5	FD Tekstilac	7	3	0	4	10	12	−2	6
6	FD Element	7	2	1	4	10	27	−17	5
7	FD Poštar	7	2	1	4	5	14	−9	5
8	FD Jedinstvo	7	0	0	7	10	23	−13	0

Source: rsssf.org

== Zagreb Provincial championship ==
- Borac Zagreb 0–1; 1-8 FD Dubrava Zagreb

== City of Osijek championship ==
- 1: FD Jedinstvo Osijek
- 2: FD Udarnik Osijek
- 3: FD Tipograf Osijek
- 4: FD Sloga Osijek
- 5: FD Bratstvo Osijek

== Region of Banija championship ==
- SFD Sloboda Sisak 8–1; 3-0 OFD Turkulin Petrinja

== District of Karlovac championship ==
Udarnik Karlovac qualified for the play-offs.

== District of Primorsko-goranska championship ==
FD Jedinstvo Sušak qualified for the play-offs.

Also played FD Crikvenica, Omladinac Senj, Plavi Jadran Pag, NK Naprijed Hreljin

== Region of Slavonia championship ==
=== Semifinals ===
- Sloga Vinkovci 5–1; 1–5; 0-3 FD Proleter Belišće
- SFD Naprijed Sisak 2–0; 1-0 FD Jedinstvo Osijek

=== Final ===
- SFD Naprijed Sisak 2–0; 0-3 FD Proleter Belišće

== District of Varaždin championship ==
Pos	Team	Pld	W	D	L	GF	GA	GD	Pts
1	RSD Tekstilac Varaždin	4	3	1	0	13	4	+9	7
2	Jedinstvo Čakovec	4	2	0	2	12	6	+6	4
3	Sloboda Varaždin	4	0	1	3	1	16	−15	1

Source: rsssf.org

== District of Bjelovar championship ==
Bjelovar qualified for the play-offs.

== Region of Dalmatia championship ==
=== Preliminary round ===
- Zadar 1–0; 1-2 Šibenik

=== Final ===
- RSD Split 0–2; 1-6 FD Hajduk Split

==== Play-offs ====
- RSD Split 4-0 Dubrovnik
- Šibenik 1–2; 0-4 RSD Split

== Play-offs ==
=== Round 1 ===
- Bjelovar 1–5; 1-2 RSD Tekstilac Varaždin
- Udarnik Karlovac 4–2; 1-3 FD Dubrava Zagreb
- SFD Naprijed Sisak 2–1; 4-1 FD Amater Zagreb
- FD Metalac Zagreb 8–0; 3-1 FD Jedinstvo Sušak

=== Round 2 ===
- FD Dubrava Zagreb 3–2; 1-3 RSD Tekstilac Varaždin
- FD Jedinstvo Sušak 6–0; 2-4 SFD Naprijed Sisak

=== Additional play-off ===
- Lokomotiva Zagreb 1–0; 3-0 FD Dubrava Zagreb

== Final Stage ==
Pos	Team	Pld	W	D	L	GF	GA	GD	Pts
1	FD Hajduk Split	14	10	2	2	51	11	+40	22
2	FD Dinamo Zagreb	14	10	2	2	40	12	+28	22
3	FD Lokomotiva Zagreb	14	6	5	3	28	13	+15	17
4	RSD Tekstilac Varaždin	14	6	3	5	24	27	−3	15
5	FD Proleter Belišće	14	6	3	5	18	28	−10	15
6	FD Metalac Zagreb	14	4	5	5	20	20	0	13
7	RSD Split	14	3	0	11	14	42	−28	6
8	FD Jedinstvo Sušak	14	0	2	12	7	49	−42	2

Source: rsssf.org

== City of Rijeka championship ==
Pos	Team	Pld	W	D	L	GF	GA	GD	Pts
1	Magazzini generali Rijeka	16	12	3	1	59	19	+40	27
2	Cantieri Rijeka	16	10	3	3	66	23	+43	23
3	Lignum Rijeka	16	10	3	3	60	32	+28	23
4	Torpedo Rijeka	16	8	3	5	48	18	+30	19
5	ROMSA Rijeka	16	8	2	6	48	38	+10	18
6	Portuale Rijeka	16	5	2	9	30	39	−9	12
7	ASPM Rijeka	16	3	3	10	37	51	−14	9
8	Metallurgica Rijeka	16	4	1	11	31	75	−44	9
9	Dinamo Rijeka	16	2	0	14	18	102	−84	4

Source: rsssf.org

== Rijeka/Istria Final ==
- SD Kvarner Rijeka 1-2 ; 4-1 US Operaia Pula
