= Viktor Ajbek =

Croatian footballer (1920–1993)

Personal information
- Date of birth: 9 September 1920
- Place of birth: Vukovar, Kingdom of Serbs, Croats and Slovenes
- Date of death: 3 February 1993 (aged 72)
- Place of death: Zagreb, Croatia

Senior career*
Years	Team	Apps	(Gls)
- NK Sloga
- Concordia Zagreb

International career
1942	Croatia	1	(0)
- * Club domestic league appearances and goals

Viktor Ajbek (9 September 1920 in Vukovar – 3 February 1993 in Zagreb) was a Croatian footballer who played international football for the Croatia national team.

== Club career ==
He started playing with the youth side of Vukovar's NK Sloga before moving to top-flight club Concordia Zagreb. He was champion of Croatia with Concordia in 1942.

== International career ==
With the establishment of the Independent State of Croatia and its respective national team, Ajbek played once for that Croatian team in an October 1942 friendly match against Greece.
