= Ludwig Gärtner =

German footballer

Personal information
- Date of birth: 19 April 1919
- Place of birth: Lorsch, Germany
- Date of death: 6 June 1995 (aged 76)
- Position: Forward

Senior career*
Years	Team	Apps	(Gls)
- Olympia Lorsch

International career
1939–1941	Germany	3	(1)
- * Club domestic league appearances and goals

Ludwig Gärtner (19 April 1919 – 6 June 1995) was a German international footballer.
