= Wilhelm Simetsreiter =

German footballer

Personal information
- Date of birth: 16 March 1915
- Place of birth: Munich, Germany
- Date of death: 17 July 2001 (aged 86)
- Position: Left wing

Senior career*
Years	Team	Apps	(Gls)
- Bayern Munich

International career
1936	Germany	8	
- * Club domestic league appearances and goals

Wilhelm "Willy" Simetsreiter (16 March 1915 – 17 July 2001), popularly known as Schimmy, was a German footballer.

== Biography ==
A native of Munich, Simetsreiter played his career along the left wing for his club Bayern Munich. He is usually considered the fastest-ever player at this position in the club's history.

He scored three goals against Luxembourg on 4 August at the 1936 Summer Olympics in Berlin. He was also part of Germany's squad at the 1936 Summer Olympics. At the time, the 21-year-old was one of the youngest players in the national side to score a hat-trick. During the 1930s, Simetsreiter was capped a total of eight times by the German national football team.
