= Nikola Staykov =

Bulgarian footballer (1907–1974)

Nikola Staykov (Bulgarian: Никола Стайков, 1907–1974) was a Bulgarian football player. He was a striker who played for Slavia Sofia and for the Bulgarian national side. With Slavia he won the national championship on three occasions. He was capped 29 times and scored 12 goals, winning the 1932 Balkan Cup in the process.
