= HŠK Dunav Zemun =

- Full name: Hrvatski športski klub Dunav Zemun
- Founded: before 1939
- Dissolved: after 1945

HŠK Dunav (Croatian: Hrvatski športski klub "Dunav") was a football club from Zemun (nowadays Serbia). Local Croats from Zemun and other parts of Syrmia gathered around this club.

== Name ==
Its name literally means Croatian Sports Club "Danube".

== History ==
This squad was founded before the Second World War.

It competed in the football championship of Independent State of Croatia. After the end of Second World War, that circumstance was used to ban the work of this football club and disband it, as it was the case with other clubs that competed in the championship of Independent State of Croatia.

In the unfinished Croatian championship 1944, in the group stage, Dunav was the champion of Zemun. In the play-offs, Dunav lost to second in the group and city rival Građanski.

== Sources ==
- (in English) Croatia Domestic Football Full Tables
