= Velcho Stoyanov =

Bulgarian footballer

Velcho Stoyanov (Bulgarian: Велчо Стоянов; 1907 – 1982), was a Bulgarian football player. He captained Slavia Sofia, which he led to the team's first national championship in 1928, and again in 1930. He played for the Bulgarian national side on 18 occasions and scored 5 goals. He was also part of Bulgaria's squad for the 1924 Summer Olympics, but he did not play in any matches.
