= Mihály Iváncsics =

Hungarian football referee

- Born: 2 November 1890; Budapest, Hungary
- Died: 28 January 1959 (aged 68)

International
Years	League	Role
1924–1940	FIFA-listed	Referee

Mihály Iváncsics (1893–1968) was an international football referee in the 1920s and 1930s. He was a linesman in the 1934 FIFA World Cup Final, played between Italy and Czechoslovakia in Rome.

Iváncsics, a contemporary of fellow Hungarian referees Gabor Boronkay, Josef Gero and Paul von Hertzka, had already gained vast experience as an international referee in the 1920s, taking charge of matches as far back as 1926 between Italy and Switzerland in Zurich.

He accepted the appointment to the Romania v Bulgaria match in 1929, just after the Hungarian–Romanian War. He refereed into the 1930s and was selected to attend the 1934 FIFA World Cup, where he was the only Hungarian referee at the tournament. In the tournament he officiated in four matches, two of which comprised the controversial Spain v Italy quarter-final in which he ran the line to both Louis Baert and Rene Mercet. His appointment to the final that year may well have been as a result of the politics arising out of that quarter-final.

He was an active international referee during the Second World War, and was appointed to the May 1940 fixture between Italy and Germany in Milan.
