= Geza Nagy-Csomag =

Romanian footballer

Personal information
- Date of birth: 1903
- Position: Striker

Senior career*
Years	Team	Apps	(Gls)
1924–1929	Stăruința Oradea		

International career
1925–1928	Romania	3	(2)

Managerial career
- 1950: Jiul Petroșani
- * Club domestic league appearances and goals

Geza Nagy-Csomag (born 1903, date of death unknown) was a Romanian footballer who played as a striker.

== International career ==
Geza Nagy-Csomag played three friendly matches for Romania in which he scored two goals, making his debut on 31 May 1925 under coach Teofil Morariu in a 4–2 away victory against Bulgaria. He scored one goal in each of his following two games played for the national team, a 6–1 victory against Bulgaria and a 4–2 victory against Turkey.
