= Slavko Beda =

Croatian footballer

Personal information
- Full name: Slavko Beda
- Date of birth: 17 October 1919
- Place of birth: Savina, Ljubno ob Savinji, Kingdom of Serbs, Croats and Slovenes
- Date of death: 8 June 1975 (aged 55)
- Place of death: Zagreb, SR Croatia, SFR Yugoslavia
- Position: Right winger

Senior career*
Years	Team	Apps	(Gls)
1935–1936	Graničar Zagreb		
1936–1945	Concordia		
1945–1947	Dinamo Zagreb		

International career
1941	Independent State of Croatia	1	(1)
- * Club domestic league appearances and goals

Slavko Beda (17 October 1919 – 8 June 1975) was a Croatian footballer who played internationally for the Croatia national team.

== Club career ==
He started his career in Zagreb, where he finish his studies, with Graničar Zagreb in 1935, and a year later he joins Concordia Zagreb, debuting for the first team in 1938 and stayed with the club until its disbanding by the new communist Yugoslav regime in 1945. He was champion of the Croatian First League with Concordia in 1942. After the war, he played with Dinamo Zagreb between 1945 and 1947. Due to health problems he ended up his career being 28.

== International career ==
Beda was capped once for the Independent State of Croatia, a World War II-era puppet state of Nazi Germany, in a match away against Slovakia in 1941.

== Personal life ==
His younger brother Oskar also played football, as a goalkeeper for Concordia and HŠK Uskok.
