= Ratko Kacian =

Croatian footballer (1917–1949)

Personal information
- Date of birth: 18 January 1917
- Place of birth: Zadar, Austria-Hungary
- Date of death: 18 June 1949 (aged 32)
- Place of death: Zagreb, FPR Yugoslavia
- Position: Striker

Youth career
- ŠK Primorac
- NK Osvit

Senior career*
Years	Team	Apps	(Gls)
1936–1939	HAŠK		
1939–1941	Hajduk Split	21	(21)
1941–1945	HAŠK		
1945–1949	Dinamo Zagreb	53	(15)

International career
1940	Banovina of Croatia	1	(0)
1941–1943	Independent State of Croatia	9	(0)
1946	Yugoslavia	1	(0)
Medal record
Men's Football
Representing Yugoslavia
Olympic Games
Silver medal – second place	1948 London	Team
- * Club domestic league appearances and goals

Ratko Kacian (Croatian pronunciation: [râtko kǎtsiaːn]; 18 January 1917 – 18 June 1949; spelled Kacijan in some sources) was a Croatian and Yugoslav footballer. He played internationally for the wartime Independent State of Croatia team from 1940 to 1943 and for the Yugoslavia national team in 1946. He was also part of Yugoslavia's squad at the 1948 Summer Olympics in London, without appearing in any matches.

== Club career ==
Kacian played for HAŠK in Zagreb and Hajduk Split before moving to Dinamo Zagreb after World War II.

== International career ==
He played a single match for the Banovina of Croatia team, (then a province of Kingdom of Yugoslavia) in a December 1940 friendly against Hungary. During the World War II he went on to earn nine caps for the Independent State of Croatia team, all of them in friendlies with other Axis powers nations. After the war, he continued playing professional football, and earned a single cap for Yugoslavia in May 1946, in a friendly against Czechoslovakia.

== Personal life ==
=== Death ===
He died of endocarditis in the summer of 1949.
