= Stadionul Romcomit =

Football stadium in Romania

Coordinates: 44.43523°N 26.082117°E

- Interactive map of Stadionul Romcomit
- Surface: Grass

Construction
- Opened: 1923
- Demolished: 1934

Tenants
- Romania (1925); Juventus București (1924–1934)

Romcomit Stadium was a football stadium in Bucharest, standing on the site now occupied by the University of Bucharest's Law Department.

== History ==
The stadium was inaugurated in 1923, being considered at the time a very modern one. It was the stadium of the team with the same name, founded by Ettore Brunelli, that in 1924 merged with Triumf and the result was Juventus București, the new tenant of the stadium.

This was the pitch were the first floodlit matches were played in Romania. On 13 and 14 September 1933, Újpest Budapest played friendly matches against CFR București and Venus București. The floodlit installation, as Ioan Chirilă described it in one of his books, was rudimentary and was formed by bulbs pinned by several rows of ropes hanged over the pitch. So at high throws, the ball "got caught" into the dark or it damaged some of the bulbs and the game had to be stopped so that a worker could replace the damaged bulbs.

The Romania national football team played two games on this stadium in 1925 against Turkey (1-2) and Bulgaria (6-1).

At the beginning of 1934, upon orders from King Carol II, the stadium was demolished to provide a site for the University of Bucharest.
