= Građanski Zemun =

HŠK Građanski Zemun
- Full name: Hrvatski športski klub Građanski Zemun
- Founded: before 1939
- Dissolved: after 1945

HŠK Građanski (Croatian: Hrvatski športski klub "Građanski") was a football club from Zemun, near Belgrade in what is now Serbia. Local Croats from Zemun and other parts of Syrmia gathered around this club.

== Name ==
Its name literally means Croatian Sports Club "Citizens' ".

== History ==
This squad was founded before the Second World War.

It competed in the football championship of Independent State of Croatia. After the end of Second World War, that circumstance was used to ban the work of this football club and disband it, as it was the case with other clubs that competed in the championship of Independent State of Croatia.

In the championship of Croatia in 1942, club took the 4th place in the group C.

In the unfinished Croatian championship 1944, in the group stage, Građanski was the vicechampion of Zemun. In the play-offs, Građanski beat the group champion and city rival Dunav. In the provincial group, the competition format was cup-system. Građanski lost to Borovo in the semi-finals.

== Sources ==
- (in English) Croatia Domestic Football Full Tables
