= Vinko Golob =

Bosnian-Herzegovinian footballer

Personal information
- Full name: Vinko Golob
- Date of birth: 22 April 1921
- Place of birth: Bileća, Kingdom of Serbs, Croats and Slovenes
- Date of death: 5 September 1995 (aged 74)
- Position: Attacking midfielder

Senior career*
Years	Team	Apps	(Gls)
1936–1940	Slavija Varaždin		
1940–1945	Concordia Zagreb		
1945–1946	Dinamo Zagreb	27	(16)
1946–1948	Bohemians Vršovice	41	(29)
1948–1949	Toulouse	16	(7)
1949–1950	Venezia	21	(5)
1950–1952	Vigevano		

International career
1948	Yugoslavia	1	(0)
- * Club domestic league appearances and goals

Vinko Golob (22 April 1921 – 5 September 1995) was a Bosnian and Yugoslav football player.

== Club career ==
Golob spent most of his career in Yugoslavia, at pre-war Croatian clubs Slavija and Concordia, and then played for Dinamo Zagreb between 1945 and 1946. He was Dinamo Zagreb's first foreign transfer, when he went abroad to join Czechoslovak club Bohemians in Prague.

In the late 1940s he also spent a season with Toulouse in France, and then Venezia and Vigevano in Italy in Serie B.

== International career ==
He made his debut for Yugoslavia in a June 1948 Balkan Cup match against Albania, which remained his sole international appearance.
