= 1974–75 PFC Cherno More Varna season =

Cherno More
1974–75 season
- Manager: Stoyan Ormandzhiev
- A Group: 14th
- Bulgarian Cup: Group stage
- Top goalscorer: Stefan Bogomilov (13)
- Biggest win: 2–0 (vs Minyor, 20 Apr 1975)
- Biggest defeat: 4–0 (vs Pirin, 1974)
Home colours	Away colours

This page covers all relevant details regarding PFC Cherno More Varna for all official competitions inside the 1974–75 season. These are A Group and Bulgarian Cup.

== Squad and league statistics ==
Goalkeepers
(Bulgaria) Ivan Simeonov	?	(?)
(Bulgaria) Vladimir Naydenov	?	(?)

Defenders
(Bulgaria) Nikolay Grancharov	?	(?)
(Bulgaria) Todor Marev	?	(?)
(Bulgaria) Georgi Zhekov	?	(?)
(Bulgaria) Dimitar Blagoev	?	(?)
(Bulgaria) Ivan Andreev	?	(?)
(Bulgaria) Ivan Ivanov	?	(?)

Midfielders
(Bulgaria) Ivan Donchev	?	(?)
(Bulgaria) Damyan Georgiev	?	(?)
(Bulgaria) Georgi Kondov	?	(?)
(Bulgaria) Nikola Dimov	?	(?)
(Bulgaria) Svetozar Svetozarov	?	(?)
(Bulgaria) Krasimir Diamandiev	?	(?)
(Bulgaria) Vladimir Zhelyazkov	?	(?)

Forwards
(Bulgaria) Todor Yordanov	?	(?)
(Bulgaria) Stefan Bogomilov	?	(13)
(Bulgaria) Zdravko Mitev	?	(?)

== Matches ==
=== A Group ===
1974 Round 1	Cherno More	2 – 3	Lokomotiv Plovdiv	Varna

1974 Round 2	Botev Vratsa	2 – 2	Cherno More	Vratsa

1974 Round 3	Cherno More	2 – 1	Lokomotiv Sofia	Varna

8 September 1974 Round 4	Dunav Ruse	0 – 1	Cherno More	Ruse

13 September 1974 Round 5	Cherno More	1 – 0	CSKA Septemvriysko Zname Sofia	Varna
	D. Georgiev 41'

1974 Round 6	Cherno More	0 – 2	Levski-Spartak Sofia	Varna
17:00 EEST

28 September 1974 Round 7	Minyor Pernik	1 – 1	Cherno More	Pernik

1974 Round 8	Cherno More	1 – 1	Trakia Plovdiv	Varna

==== League table ====
Pos	Team	Pld	W	D	L	GF	GA	GD	Pts	Qualification or relegation
12	Pirin Blagoevgrad	30	11	5	14	31	42	−11	27	
13	Minyor Pernik	30	11	4	15	36	45	−9	26	
14	Cherno More Varna	30	9	8	13	28	43	−15	26	
15	Etar Veliko Tarnovo (R)	30	8	5	17	43	56	−13	21	Relegation to 1975–76 B Group
16	Yantra Gabrovo (R)	30	7	6	17	30	50	−20	20	Relegation to 1975–76 B Group

Source: rsssf.com
(R) Relegated

==== Results summary ====
Overall								Home						Away					
Pld	W	D	L	GF	GA	GD	Pts	W	D	L	GF	GA	GD	W	D	L	GF	GA	GD
30	14	5	11	35	29	+6	47	10	1	4	23	12	+11	4	4	7	12	17	−5

==== League performance ====
Round	1	2	3	4	5	6	7	8	9	10	11	12	13	14	15	16	17	18	19	20	21	22	23	24	25	26	27	28	29	30
Ground	H	A	H	A	H	A	H	A	H	A	H	H	A	H	A	A	H	A	H	A	H	A	H	A	H	A	A	H	A	H
Result	L	D	W	L	L	W	L	W	W	L	D	W	D	W	W	D	L	L	W	L	W	W	W	D	W	L	L	W	L	W

A = Away; H = Home; W = Win; D = Draw; L = Loss
