= 1938 FIFA World Cup qualification Group 7 =

Football tournament qualification stage

In the 1938 FIFA World Cup qualification Group 7, the two teams played against each other on a home-and-away basis. The winner would qualify for the third FIFA World Cup held in France.

== Matches ==
=== Bulgaria vs Czechoslovakia ===
Bulgaria	1 — 1 (final score after 90 minutes)	Czechoslovakia
Manager: (Bulgaria) Stanislav Toms Team: 01 - GK - Radoslav Maznikov; 02 - DF - Anastas Kovachev; 03 - DF - Georgi Balkchiev; 04 - MF - Ljubomir Petrov; 05 - MF - Panayot Stefanov; 06 - MF - Borislav Gabrovski; 07 - FW - Nikola Nikolov; 08 - FW - Ljubomir Angelov (capt.); 09 - FW - Krum Milev; 10 - FW - Georgi Pachedzhiev; 11 - FW - Borislav Kamenski Substitutes: none Unused Substitutes: ? Scorers: 1-1 Georgi Pachedzhiev (89', pen.)	Half-time: 0-1 Competition: World Cup qualifier 1938 (Group 6) Date: Sunday; 7 November 1937 Kick off: ? Venue: Junak Stadium, Sofia Attendance: 15000 Referee: Rinaldo Barlassina ITA Assistants: ? Match rules: 90 minutes substitutes ?	Manager: (Czechoslovakia) Josef Tesař Team: 01 - GK - Vojtěch Věchet; 02 - DF - Jaroslav Burgr (capt.); 03 - DF - Josef Čtyřoký; 04 - MF - Josef Košťálek; 05 - MF - Jaroslav Bouček; 06 - MF - Karel Kolský; 07 - FW - Jan Říha; 08 - FW - František Kloz; 09 - FW - Jiří Sobotka; 10 - FW - Vlastimil Kopecký; 11 - FW - Oldřich Rulc Substitutes: none Unused Substitutes: ? Scorers: 0-1 Jan Říha (44')

=== Czechoslovakia vs Bulgaria ===
Czechoslovakia	6 — 0 (final score after 90 minutes)	Bulgaria
Manager: (Czechoslovakia) Václav Meissner Team: 01 - GK - František Plánička (capt.); 02 - DF - Jaroslav Burgr; 03 - DF - Ferdinand Daučík; 04 - MF - Josef Košťálek; 05 - MF - Arnošt Kreuz; 06 - MF - Karel Kolský; 07 - FW - Jan Říha; 08 - FW - Josef Ludl; 09 - FW - Ladislav Šimůnek; 10 - FW - Oldřich Nejedlý; 11 - FW - Ľudovít Rado Substitutes: none Unused Substitutes: ? Scorers: 1-0 Ladislav Šimůnek (21'); 2-0 Oldřich Nejedlý (57'); 3-0 Josef Ludl (73'); 4-0 Oldřich Nejedlý (77'); 5-0 Ladislav Šimůnek (79'); 6-0 Ladislav Šimůnek (89')	Half-time: 1-0 Competition: World Cup qualifier 1938 (Group 6) Date: Sunday; 24 April 1938 Kick off: ? Venue: Sparta Stadion, Prague Attendance: 28000 Referee: Pál von Herczka HUN Assistants: ? Match rules: 90 minutes substitutes ?	Manager: (Bulgaria) Stanislav Toms Team: 01 - GK - Konstantin Maznikov; 02 - DF - Nikola Nikolov; 03 - DF - Georgi Balkchiev; 04 - MF - Ljubomir Petrov; 05 - MF - Panayot Stefanov; 06 - MF - Borislav Gabrovski (capt.); 07 - FW - Ljubomir Angelov; 08 - FW - Mihail Lozanov; 09 - FW - Stefan Kalchev; 10 - FW - Georgi Pachedzhiev; 11 - FW - Vuchko Yordanov Substitutes: none Unused Substitutes: ? Scorers: -

NOTE: Ľudovít Rado missed a penalty.

== Team stats ==
=== Czechoslovakia ===
Head coach: (Czechoslovakia) Josef Tesař (first match), (Czechoslovakia) Václav Meissner (second match)

Pos.	Player	DoB	Games played	Goals	Minutes played	Sub off	Sub on	(Bulgaria)	(Bulgaria)	Club
MF	Jaroslav Bouček	November 13, 1912	1	0	90	0	0	90	-	(Czechoslovakia) Sparta Prague
DF	Jaroslav Burgr	March 7, 1906	2	0	180	0	0	90	90	(Czechoslovakia) Sparta Prague
DF	Josef Čtyřoký	September 30, 1906	1	0	90	0	0	90	-	(Czechoslovakia) Sparta Prague
DF	Ferdinand Daučík	May 30, 1910	1	0	90	0	0	-	90	(Czechoslovakia) SK Slavia Prague
FW	František Kloz	May 19, 1905	1	0	90	0	0	90	-	(Czechoslovakia) SK Kladno
MF	Karel Kolský	September 21, 1914	2	0	180	0	0	90	90	(Czechoslovakia) Sparta Prague
FW	Vlastimil Kopecký	October 14, 1912	1	0	90	0	0	90	-	(Czechoslovakia) SK Slavia Prague
MF	Josef Košťálek	August 31, 1909	2	0	180	0	0	90	90	(Czechoslovakia) Sparta Prague
MF	Arnošt Kreuz	March 14, 1910	1	0	90	0	0	-	90	(Czechoslovakia) SK Pardubice
FW	Josef Ludl	June 3, 1916	1	1	90	0	0	-	90	(Czechoslovakia) FK Viktoria Žižkov
FW	Oldřich Nejedlý	December 25, 1909	1	2	90	0	0	-	90	(Czechoslovakia) Sparta Prague
GK	František Plánička	June 2, 1904	1	0	90	0	0	-	90	(Czechoslovakia) SK Slavia Prague
FW	Ľudovít Rado	July 27, 1914	1	0	90	0	0	-	90
FW	Jan Říha	November 11, 1915	2	1	180	0	0	90	90	(Czechoslovakia) Sparta Prague
FW	Oldřich Rulc	March 28, 1911	1	0	90	0	0	90	-	(Czechoslovakia) SK Židenice
FW	Ladislav Šimůnek	October 4, 1916	1	3	900	0	0	-	90	(Czechoslovakia) SK Slavia Prague
FW	Jiří Sobotka	June 6, 1911	1	0	90	0	0	90	-	(Czechoslovakia) SK Slavia Prague
GK	Vojtěch Věchet	June 2, 1904	1	0	90	0	0	90	-

=== Bulgaria ===
Head coach: (Bulgaria) Stanislav Toms

Pos.	Player	DoB	Games played	Goals	Minutes played	Sub off	Sub on	(Czechoslovakia)	(Czechoslovakia)	Club
FW	Ljubomir Angelov	October 4, 1912	2	0	180	0	0	90	90	(Bulgaria) AS 23 Sofia
DF	Georgi Balkchiev		2	0	180	0	0	90	90	(Bulgaria) AS 23 Sofia
MF	Borislav Gabrovski	January 30, 1910	2	0	180	0	0	90	90	(Bulgaria) PFC Levski Sofia
FW	Stefan Kalchev	1915	1	0	90	0	0	-	90	(Bulgaria) Ticha Varna
FW	Borislav Kamenski		1	0	90	0	0	90	-	(Bulgaria) FK 13
DF	Anastas Kovachev	1911	1	0	90	0	0	90	-	(Bulgaria) PFC Slavia Sofia
FW	Mihail Lozanov		1	0	90	0	0	-	90
GK	Konstantin Maznikov	1904	2	0	180	0	0	90	90	(Bulgaria) PFC Levski Sofia
FW	Krum Milev	June 11, 1915	1	0	90	0	0	90	-	(Bulgaria) PFC Slavia Sofia
FW	Nikola Nikolov	January 25, 1908	2	0	180	0	0	90	90	(Bulgaria) PFC Levski Sofia
FW	Georgi Pachedzhiev	March 1, 1916	2	1	180	0	0	90	90	(Bulgaria) AS 23 Sofia
MF	Liubomir Petrov		2	0	180	0	0	90	90
MF	Panayot Stefanov		2	0	180	0	0	90	90	(Bulgaria) PFC Slavia Sofia
FW	Vuchko Yordanov	1915	1	0	90	0	0	-	90
