= 1940 Bulgarian Cup final =

1944 Bulgarian Cup final
FC 13 Sofia	Sportklub Plovdiv
2	1
- Date: 13 October 1940
- Venue: Levski Playground, Sofia
- Referee: Stefan Chumpalov (Sofia)
- Attendance: 5,000

The 1940 Bulgarian Cup final was the 3rd final of the Bulgarian Cup (in this period the tournament was named Tsar's Cup), and was contested between FC 13 Sofia and Sportklub Plovdiv on 13 October 1940 at Levski Playground in Sofia. FC 13 won the final 2–1.

== Match ==
=== Details ===
13 October 1940
15:30 EEST

FC 13 Sofia	2–1	Sportklub Plovdiv
Nikolaev 27'; Stoichkov 85'		Bazovski 13' (o.g.)

Levski Playground, Sofia
Attendance: 0
Referee: Stefan Chumpalov (Sofia)

FC 13	Sportklub

GK	1	(Bulgaria) Carlo Nedyalkov
DF	2	(Bulgaria) Yordan Iliev
DF	3	(Bulgaria) Stoyan Bazovski
MF	4	(Bulgaria) Boris Penchev
MF	5	(Bulgaria) Petar Petrov
MF	6	(Bulgaria) Trayko Krastanov
FW	7	(Bulgaria) Nikola Nikolov
FW	8	(Bulgaria) Dimitar Nikolaev
FW	9	(Bulgaria) Borislav Asparuhov
FW	10	(Bulgaria) Krum Stoichkov
FW	11	(Bulgaria) Borislav Kamenski (c)

GK	1	(Bulgaria) Dimitar Antonov
DF	2	(Bulgaria) Toma Tomov
DF	3	(Bulgaria) Dimitar Batinov
MF	4	(Bulgaria) Asparuh Karayanev
MF	5	(Bulgaria) Hristo Bachvarov (c)
MF	6	(Bulgaria) Ivan Lazarov
FW	7	(Bulgaria) Hristo Popov
FW	8	(Bulgaria) Metodi Karayanev
FW	9	(Bulgaria) Svetoslav Matanov
FW	10	(Bulgaria) Atanas Todorov
FW	11	(Bulgaria) Stefan Paunov

== See also ==
- 1939–40 Bulgarian National Football Division
