= 1938 Bulgarian Cup final =

FC 13 Sofia	Levski Ruse
3	0
- (Walkover)
- Date: 3 October 1938
- Venue: Yunak Stadium, Sofia
- Referee: Vasil Kavaldzhiev (Pleven)
- Attendance: 10,000

The 1938 Bulgarian Cup final was the 1st final of the Bulgarian Cup (in this period the tournament was named Tsar's Cup), and was contested between FC 13 Sofia and Levski Ruse on 3 October 1938 at Yunak Stadium in Sofia. FC 13 won the final 3–0 (walkover).

== Match ==
=== Details ===
3 October 1938

FC 13 Sofia	3–0 (w/o)	Levski Ruse
Asparuhov 16'; Tabakov 31'; Stoichkov 80'	In 80th minute the match was canceled by Levski's players at 3−1 for FC 13 as a protest against refereeing	Toporov 8'

Yunak Stadium, Sofia
Attendance: 10,000
Referee: Vasil Kavaldzhiev (Pleven)

FC 13	Levski

GK	1	(Bulgaria) Atanas Talev
DF	2	(Bulgaria) Yordan Iliev
DF	3	(Bulgaria) Petar Ivanov
MF	4	(Bulgaria) Boris Penchev
MF	5	(Bulgaria) Stefan Kalachev
MF	6	(Bulgaria) Borislav Kamenski
FW	7	(Bulgaria) Nikola Nikolov
FW	8	(Bulgaria) Borislav Asparuhov
FW	9	(Bulgaria) Krum Stoichkov
FW	10	(Bulgaria) Lozan Kotsev
FW	11	(Bulgaria) Vasil Tabakov (c)

GK	1	(Bulgaria) Marko Nikolov
DF	2	(Bulgaria) Prodan Novakov
DF	3	(Bulgaria) Borislav Peychev
MF	4	(Bulgaria) Konstantin Novakov (c)
MF	5	(Bulgaria) Radoslav Dukov
MF	6	(Bulgaria) Ventseslav Angelov
FW	7	(Bulgaria) Todor Lalchev
FW	8	(Bulgaria) Todor Goranov
FW	9	(Bulgaria) Dimitar Toporov
FW	10	(Bulgaria) Shami Pinkas
FW	11	(Bulgaria) Sider Dimitrov

== See also ==
- 1937–38 Bulgarian National Football Division
