= 1987–88 B Group =

Season of the Bulgarian B Football Group

Bulgarian B Group
- Season: 1987–88
- Champions: Cherno More
- Promoted: Cherno More; Dunav
- Relegated: Rozova Dolina; Balkan; Neftochimic; Dimitrovgrad
- Matches: 380
- Goals: 958 (2.52 per match)
- Top goalscorer: (Bulgaria) Georgi Todorov (28 goals)

The 1987–88 B Group was the 32nd season of the Bulgarian B Football Group, the second tier of the Bulgarian football league system. A total of 20 teams contested the league.

== Teams ==
=== Stadiums and locations ===
Locations of the 1987–88 Bulgarian B Group teams

Team	City	Stadium	Capacity
Akademik	Svishtov	Akademik	13,500
Arda	Kardzhali	Druzhba (Kardzhali)	12,000
Balkan	Botevgrad	Hristo Botev (Botevgrad)	8,000
Bdin	Vidin	Georgi Benkovski	12,000
Cherno More	Varna	Yuri Gagarin	35,000
Dimitrovgrad	Dimitrovgrad	Rakovski	12,000
Dobrudzha	Dobrich	Druzhba (Dobrich)	16,000
Dunav	Ruse	Dunav	12,000
Haskovo	Haskovo	Dimitar Kanev	14,000
Hebar	Pazardzhik	Lyuben Shkodrov	8,000
Ludogorets	Razgrad	Dyanko Stefanov	8,000
Madara	Shumen	Panayot Volov	28,000
Neftochimic	Burgas	Neftochimic	12,000
Osam	Lovech	Hristo Karpachev	12,000
Rila	Dupnitsa	Bonchuk	22,000
Rozova Dolina	Kazanlak	Tsvyatko Radoynov	15,000
Spartak	Plovdiv	Spartak	10,000
Tundzha	Yambol	Nikola Laskov	12,000
Vihren	Sandanski	Vihren	8,000
Yantra	Gabrovo	Hristo Botev (Gabrovo)	12,000

=== Personnel ===
Team	Manager	Captain
Akademik Svishtov	(Bulgaria) Petar Shatrov	(Bulgaria) Todor Borisov
Arda	(Bulgaria) Stefan Velichkov	(Bulgaria) Hristo Topalov
Balkan	(Bulgaria) Todor Nikolov	(Bulgaria) Vasil Redovski
Bdin	(Bulgaria) Ivan Petkov	(Bulgaria) Toshko Borisov
Cherno More	(Bulgaria) Bozhil Kolev	(Bulgaria) Todor Marev
Dimitrovgrad	(Bulgaria) Mavro Mavrov	(Bulgaria) Stefan Metodiev
Dobrudzha	(Bulgaria) Kurti Nedev	(Bulgaria) Georgi Mirchev
Dunav	(Bulgaria) Vasil Razsolkov	(Bulgaria) Borislav Bogomilov
Haskovo	(Bulgaria) Dobrin Nenov	(Bulgaria) Sasho Georgiev
Hebar	(Bulgaria) Toncho Prodanov	(Bulgaria) Lazar Dimitrov
Ludogorets	(Bulgaria) Lyuben Markov	(Bulgaria) Andrey Borilov
Madara	(Bulgaria) Todor Todorov	(Bulgaria) Stoyan Cheshmedzhiev
Neftochimic	(Bulgaria) Dimitar Dimitrov	(Bulgaria) Drazho Stoyanov
Osam	(Bulgaria) Tsetso Zelenski	(Bulgaria) Petar Hubchev
Rila	(Bulgaria) Mario Mitev	(Bulgaria) Roman Karakolev
Rozova Dolina	(Bulgaria) Petar Dimitrov	(Bulgaria) Kolyo Petkov
Spartak Plovdiv	(Bulgaria) Stancho Bonchev	(Bulgaria) Nasko Nechev
Tundzha	(Bulgaria) Asen Milushev	(Bulgaria) Ivan Penchev
Vihren	(Bulgaria) Andreya Metodiev	(Bulgaria) Todor Mechev
Yantra	(Bulgaria) Todor Todorov	(Bulgaria) Vesko Ganchev

== League table ==
Pos	Team	Pld	W	D	L	GF	GA	GD	Pts	Promotion or relegation
1	Cherno More Varna (P)	38	20	10	8	57	36	+21	50	Promotion to 1988–89 A Group
2	Dunav Ruse (P)	38	17	11	10	48	40	+8	45	Promotion to 1988–89 A Group
3	Arda Kardzhali	38	20	5	13	53	47	+6	45	
4	Hebar Pazardzhik	38	16	12	10	47	41	+6	44	
5	Bdin Vidin	38	18	5	15	53	45	+8	41	
6	Yantra Gabrovo	38	16	9	13	52	46	+6	41	
7	Vihren Sandanski	38	18	5	15	43	47	−4	41	
8	Madara Shumen	37	18	4	15	69	43	+26	40	
9	Dobrudzha Dobrich	38	14	10	14	48	49	−1	38	
10	Osam Lovech	38	16	6	16	49	55	−6	38	
11	Tundzha Yambol	38	16	5	17	53	46	+7	37	
12	Akademik Svishtov	38	14	9	15	39	41	−2	37	
13	Spartak Plovdiv	38	15	7	16	47	52	−5	37	
14	Haskovo	38	16	4	18	43	42	+1	36	
15	Ludogorets Razgrad	38	14	6	18	41	53	−12	34	
16	Rila Dupnitsa	38	11	11	16	43	49	−6	33	
17	Rozova Dolina Kazanlak (R)	38	13	7	18	45	57	−12	33	Relegation to 1988–89 V Group
18	Balkan Botevgrad (R)	38	10	12	16	33	46	−13	32	Relegation to 1988–89 V Group
19	Neftochimic Burgas (R)	37	13	5	19	52	62	−10	31	Relegation to 1988–89 V Group
20	Dimitrovgrad (R)	38	9	7	22	39	61	−22	25	Relegation to 1988–89 V Group

Source: 1988 Football retro-football.bg
Rules for classification: 1) points; 2) goal difference; 3) number of goals scored.
(P) Promoted; (R) Relegated

== Top scorers ==
Rank	Scorer	Club	Goals
1	(Bulgaria) Georgi Todorov	Madara Shumen	28
2	(Bulgaria) Ognyan Radev	Cherno More	18
3	(Bulgaria) Lyubomir Burnarski	Spartak Plovdiv	17
3	(Bulgaria) Alyosha Bayraktarov	Arda Kardzhali	17
5	(Bulgaria) Krasimir Ibrishimov	Yantra Gabrovo	15
5	(Bulgaria) Plamen Linkov	Osam Lovech	15
7	(Bulgaria) Shibil Cheshmedzhiev	Arda Kardzhali	14
8	(Bulgaria) Diyan Petkov	Neftochimic	12
8	(Bulgaria) Yordan Dimitrov	Dunav Ruse	12
8	(Bulgaria) Nikolay Kostov	Dobrudzha	12
11	(Bulgaria) Ivan Petrov	Cherno more	11
11	(Bulgaria) Stanimir Stoilov	Haskovo	11
11	(Bulgaria) Ivan Chorlev	Hebar	11
11	(Bulgaria) Toshko Borisov	Bdin Vidin	11
11	(Bulgaria) Plamen Petkov	Bdin Vidin	11
