= Vuchko Yordanov =

Bulgarian footballer (1915–1990)

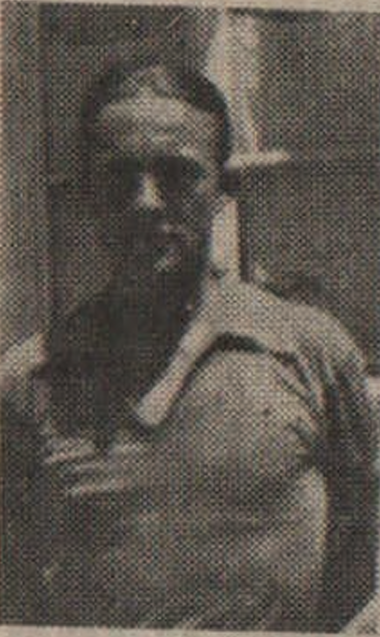

Personal information
- Date of birth: 1915
- Date of death: 15 April 1990 (aged 74–75)
- Position: Forward

Senior career*
| Years | Team | Apps | (Gls) |
- AS-23 Sofia
- Lokomotiv Sofia

International career
| 1935–1947 | Bulgaria | 18 | (5) |
- * Club domestic league appearances and goals

Vuchko Yordanov (1915 – 15 April 1990) was a Bulgarian footballer who played as a forward for AS-23 Sofia. He made 18 appearances for the Bulgaria national team from 1935 to 1947. He was also part of Bulgaria's team for their qualification matches for the 1938 FIFA World Cup.
