= 1941 Bulgarian Cup =

1941 Tsar's Cup
Царска купа

Tournament details
- Country: Bulgaria

Final positions
- Champions: AS 23 Sofia (1st cup)
- Runners-up: Napredak Ruse

Tournament statistics
- Top goal scorer(s): Ljuben Janev (Macedonia) (9 goals)

The 1941 Bulgarian Cup (in this period the tournament was named Tsar's Cup) was the fourth cup competition, which took place in parallel to the national championship. The cup was won by AS 23 Sofia who beat Napredak Ruse 4–2 in the final at the City Stadium in Dobrich.

== First round ==
Team 1	Score	Team 2
Napredak Ruse	3–0 (w/o)	Tsar Krum Byala Slatina
Hadzhislavchev Pavlikeni	3−1	Orlovets Gabrovo
Bdin Vidin	5−3	Belite orli Pleven
Parchevich Plovdiv	3−0	Botev Haskovo
Levski Dupnitsa	1−3	Macedonia Skopje
AS 23 Sofia	bye	
Pobeda Varna	bye	

== Quarter-finals ==
Team 1	Score	Team 2
Macedonia Skopje	12−2	Parchevich Plovdiv
Bdin Vidin	0−3	AS 23 Sofia
Hadzhislavchev Pavlikeni	1−0	Pobeda Varna
Napredak Ruse	bye	

== Semi-finals ==
Team 1	Score	Team 2
Napredak Ruse	1−0	Macedonia Skopje
AS 23 Sofia	6−0	Hadzhislavchev Pavlikeni

== Final ==
=== Details ===
3 October 1941

AS 23 Sofia	4−2	Napredak Ruse
Angelov 12', 57'; Kuzmanov 30'; Todorov 62'		Marinov 65'; Manev 75'

City Stadium, Dobrich
Attendance: 10,000
Referee: Kitso Pomenov (Sofia)

AS 23	Napredak
