= Borislav Gabrovski =

Bulgarian footballer (1910–1977)

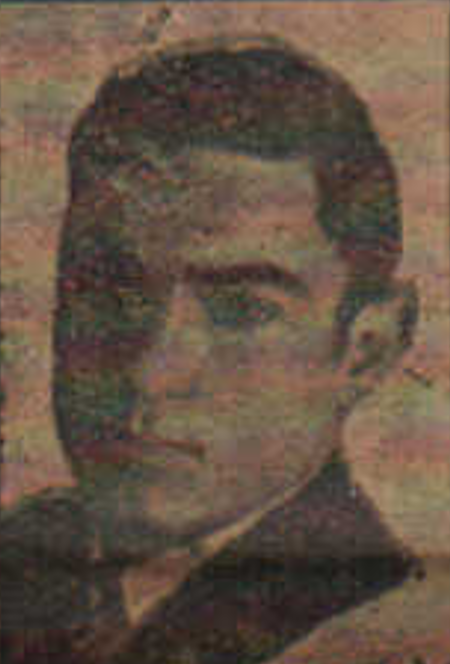

Personal information
- Date of birth: 30 January 1910
- Date of death: 14 August 1977 (aged 67)
- Position: Midfielder

Senior career*
Years	Team	Apps	(Gls)
- AS-23 Sofia
- SC Levski, Sofia
- SC Levski, Ruse
- SC Levski Sofia (second time)

International career
1929–1938	Bulgaria	30	(0)
- * Club domestic league appearances and goals

Borislav Gabrovski (30 January 1910 – 14 August 1977) was a Bulgarian footballer who played as a midfielder. He made 30 appearances for the Bulgaria national team from 1929 to 1938. He was also part of Bulgaria's team for their qualification matches for the 1938 FIFA World Cup.

He played for various clubs including OSC AS-23, Sofia and SC Levski, Sofia. 15 of his 30 international games were played while he was at Levski Sofia and 11 while he was at AS-23 .
