= 1939–40 Bulgarian National Football Division =

Bulgarian National Football Division
- Season: 1939–40
- Champions: ZhSK Sofia
- Relegated: Levski Ruse; Vladislav Varna

The 1939–40 season of the Bulgarian National Football Division was contested by 10 teams. ZhSK Sofia won the championship.

== League standings ==
Pos	Team	Pld	W	D	L	GF	GA	GD	Pts
1	ZhSK Sofia	18	10	3	5	31	27	+4	23
2	Levski Sofia	18	9	4	5	29	18	+11	22
3	Slavia Sofia	18	9	4	5	30	20	+10	22
4	AS 23 Sofia	18	9	2	7	41	27	+14	20
5	FC 13 Sofia	18	6	7	5	37	29	+8	19
6	Shipka Sofia	18	7	3	8	25	27	−2	17
7	Ticha Varna	18	6	5	7	17	24	−7	17
8	Sportclub Plovdiv	18	4	9	5	17	24	−7	17
9	Levski Ruse	18	4	4	10	13	27	−14	12
10	Vladislav Varna	18	3	5	10	14	31	−17	11

Source: rsssf.com

== Results ==
Home \ Away	A23	F13	LVR	LEV	SHI	SLA	SCP	TIC	VLA	ZHS
AS 23 Sofia		1–1	4–0	1–2	2–1	1–4	5–0	4–0	2–0	2–3
FC 13 Sofia	3–1		3–0	3–4	2–4	0–3	0–0	1–1	1–1	2–2
Levski Ruse	1–2	1–4		1–1	0–1	0–3	0–0	0–0	2–0	0–2
Levski Sofia	2–1	3–0	0–0		0–1	1–2	0–0	3–0	5–0	2–0
Shipka Sofia	3–0	1–7	2–0	1–1		0–1	0–2	1–0	0–0	2–3
Slavia Sofia	3–1	1–4	0–1	1–2	2–2		0–0	0–2	3–1	0–1
Sportclub Plovdiv	1–1	1–1	1–4	0–1	2–1	1–1		0–3	0–0	2–2
Ticha Varna	1–5	3–3	1–0	2–0	2–1	0–0	1–3		1–0	0–2
Vladislav Varna	1–4	2–1	1–2	2–1	0–3	1–2	3–1	0–0		2–2
ZhSK Sofia	1–4	0–1	2–1	3–1	3–1	2–4	1–3	1–0	1–0	

Legend: Blue = home team win; Yellow = draw; Red = away team win.
