= Vojtěch Věchet =

Czech footballer

Personal information
- Date of birth: 8 February 1912
- Place of birth: Nymburk, Bohemia, Austria-Hungary
- Date of death: 6 September 1988 (aged 76)

Senior career*
Years	Team	Apps	(Gls)
- Polaban Nymburk
- Sparta Prague

International career
1937–1939	Czechoslovakia	5	(0)
- * Club domestic league appearances and goals

Vojtěch Věchet (8 February 1912 – 6 September 1988) was a Czech footballer. He played in five matches for the Czechoslovakia national football team from 1937 to 1939. He was also named in Czechoslovakia's squad for the Group 7 qualification tournament for the 1938 FIFA World Cup.
