= New Varna Stadium =

Multi-purpose stadium in Varna, Bulgaria

Arena Varna
- Interactive map of Arena Varna
- Full name: Arena Varna
- Location: Varna, Bulgaria
- Coordinates: 43°13′16″N 27°56′35″E
- Owner: Chimimport AD (55,5%); Bulgarian Government (30,7%); Varna Municipality (12,8%)
- Operator: Sports Complex Varna AD
- Capacity: 22,441
- Surface: Grass
- Field size: 105 × 68

Construction
- Groundbreaking: September 12, 2008
- Opened: TBD
- Cost: € 70 million
- Architects: Gerkan, Marg and Partners, Proin Plus AD
- Structural engineers: schlaich bergermann partner, Tanyu Dimitrov & Partners AD
- General contractors: Planex Holding OOD, Tehnoimporteksport AD

Tenants
- PFC Cherno More Varna (TBD); FC Fratria (TBD)

Arena Varna (Bulgarian: Арена Варна) is a new multi-purpose all-seater stadium currently under construction in Varna, Bulgaria. The stadium will be built in the place of the former Yuri Gagarin Stadium. Once finished, the stadium will be used mostly for football matches and will also be the new home ground of the local Cherno More Varna Football Club. The venue will have a capacity of 22,441 spectators. The construction of the stadium has been hampered by numerous economic setbacks. As of May 2026, the stadium is yet to be completed.

== History ==
=== Project ===
It was due to open in 2013 and would have a capacity of 30,000 spectators with a possible expansion to 40,000. The stadium, as part of Sport Complex Varna, will have an underground parking area, convertible roof covers, office lounges, two-tier stands and four 50-metre (160 ft) towers, which will block the pressure of the terrain and bring the stadium in a shape of a ship. The convertible roof covers would be made of transparent panels, which would allow the light of the floodlights to stream inside the pitch during night matches. The venue would be awarded with an elite stadium rating by UEFA.

The sport complex and its concept were designed by the German architectural company GMP International GmbH, which built several stadiums for the 2006 FIFA World Cup, including the renovation of the Olympiastadion in Berlin and the construction of the Commerzbank-Arena in Frankfurt respectively. The stadium was also proposed to support a possible bid as a venue for the Euro 2020, which Bulgaria and Romania were planning to host. The construction officially started on September 12, 2008, with the demolishing of the former Yuri Gagarin Stadium.

In the follow-up years, the initial project by GMP International GmbH was partially redesigned due to the 2008 financial crisis that affected the stadium's construction. As a result, the capacity of the stadium was reduced to 22,000 spectators, the transparent roof covers were replaced and the roof towers were removed from the original design.

=== Construction ===
The start of the stadium's construction was placed on hold in 2009, due to financing difficulties during the 2008 financial crisis. However, in the summer of 2015, after the public pressure and debates for the need of a new stadium in Varna, the local governors, who also represented a minority stake in the stadium’s ownership, secured 30% of the required funding through the sale of an adjacent land lot. Consequently, the new stadium's construction finally commenced, with the Bulgarian construction company Planex serving as the principal contractor. The completion of the works was expected by the fall of 2018, with the inaugural match to be played in early 2019. As of summer 2023, the stadium remains under construction. In October 2024 Bulgarian government was joined to the ownership of the stadium, in order to boost the construction.
