= Georgi Pachedzhiev =

Bulgarian footballer and manager

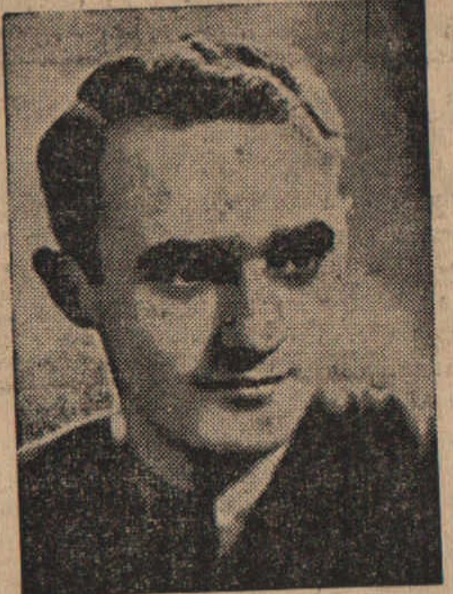

Personal information
- Date of birth: 1 March 1916
- Place of birth: Sofia, Bulgaria
- Date of death: 12 April 2005 (aged 89)
- Place of death: Sofia, Bulgaria
- Position: Forward

Senior career*
Years	Team	Apps	(Gls)
1932–1936	Sportklub Sofia		
1937–1943	AS 23 Sofia		
1944–1946	Chavdar Sofia	9	(6)
1946–1950	Levski Sofia	36	(11)
1950–1953	Stroitel Sofia		

International career
1935–1950	Bulgaria	9	(2)

Managerial career
- 1956–1960: Levski Sofia
- 1960–1962: Bulgaria
- 1968–1970: AC Omonia
- * Club domestic league appearances and goals

Georgi Pachedzhiev (Bulgarian: Γеорги Пачеджиев; 1 March 1916 – 12 April 2005) was a Bulgarian football manager who coached Bulgaria at the 1962 FIFA World Cup, the first ever time that Bulgaria did reach the finals. As a footballer, he won the most trophies while playing for Levski Sofia, and was the top scorer in the A Group in 1939 with fourteen goals. He died in April 2005.

== Honours ==
Player

Sportclub Sofia

- Bulgarian A PFG: 1935

Levski Sofia

- Bulgarian A PFG: 1947, 1949
- Bulgarian Cup: 1947, 1949

OSK AS-23

- Bulgarian Cup: 1941

Slavia Sofia

- Bulgarian Cup: 1952

Individual

- Bulgarian A PFG top goalscorer: 1939 (14 goals)

Coach

Levski Sofia

- Bulgarian Cup: 1956, 1957, 1959

AC Omonia

- Cypriot First Division: 1966
