= Liubomir Petrov =

Bulgarian footballer

Personal information
- Date of birth: 10 January 1913
- Date of death: 28 June 1999 (aged 86)

International career
| Years | Team | Apps | (Gls) |
| 1935–1947 | Bulgaria | 13 | (0) |

Liubomir Petrov (10 January 1913 – 28 June 1999) was a Bulgarian footballer. He played in thirteen matches for the Bulgaria national football team from 1935 to 1947. He was also part of Bulgaria's team for their qualification matches for the 1938 FIFA World Cup.
