= Mohamed Achi =

French footballer (born 2002)

Personal information
- Full name: Mohamed Achi Bouakline
- Date of birth: 16 January 2002 (age 24)
- Place of birth: Bondy, France
- Height: 1.81 m (5 ft 11 in)
- Position: Midfielder

Team information
- Current team: Cherno More
- Number: 11

Youth career
- 2010–2016: AS Bondy
- 2016–2021: Nantes

Senior career*
Years	Team	Apps	(Gls)
2020–2024	Nantes B	57	(11)
2021–2024	Nantes	3	(0)
2023	→ Paris 13 Atletico (loan)	13	(0)
2024–2026	Rodez	20	(1)
2026–	Cherno More	10	(1)

International career
2021–2022	France U20	6	(1)
- * Club domestic league appearances and goals as of 13 October 2026

Mohamed Achi (born 16 January 2002) is a French professional footballer who plays as a midfielder for Bulgarian First League club Cherno More Varna.

== Early life ==
Mohamed Achi was born in Bondy, Île-de-France, where he started playing football, at the local club, along the likes of Ateef Konaté, William Saliba or even his elder Kylian Mbappé, as Kylian's father Wilfried Mbappé was his youth coach there.

== Club career ==
Having joined the Nantes youth system as a 14-year-old, his promising career was however halted by a serious leg injury, still managing to win the national U17 championship during the 2018–19 season, in a team comprising the likes of Jean-Claude Ntenda, Gor Manvelyan, Jean-Baptiste Gorby and Quentin Merlin. But it was during the following 2019–20 Coupe Gambardella that he became a prominent figure of the Nantes academy, reaching the quarter finals of the national youth cup, before the competition was eventually canceled because of COVID.

Achi signed his first professional contract with Nantes in December 2021, having already become a central piece of the reserve team in National 2, as he had scored 3 goals and delivered 3 assists for 13 appearances during the first part of that season.

He made his first team debut under Antoine Kombouaré's management on the 21 May 2022, replacing Randal Kolo Muani during a 1–1 home Ligue 1 draw against Saint-Étienne.

On 31 January 2023, Achi was loaned to Paris 13 Atletico in Championnat National.

== International career ==
Also eligible for the Morocco national team through his dual nationality, Archi was first called up to the France U20 in November 2021, making his debut during a friendly game against Germany where he scored a goal from a 25-meter free kick, temporarily equalizing, before Germany eventually scored a late goal to win the game 3–2. He subsequently became a regular with the French youth selection.

In June 2022, he won the Maurice Revello Tournament in France with the France U20 team.

== Style of play ==
First growing as a number 10 through the youth academies, Achi was later moved to the lower positions of milieu relayeur or defensive midfielder.

Described as a sharp and elegant midfielder, able to make progressive and precise passes, he also added a more aggressive and explosive dimension to his game as he made his first step into professionalism in 2021–22.

== Honours ==
Nantes

- Championnat National U17: 2018–19
