= Miguel Barandas =

Portuguese footballer (born 2000)

Personal information
- Full name: Duarte Miguel da Silva Barandas
- Date of birth: 10 April 2000 (age 26)
- Place of birth: Vila Real, Portugal
- Height: 1.75 m (5 ft 9 in)
- Position: Winger

Team information
- Current team: Cherno More
- Number: 7

Youth career
- 2008–2013: Abambres
- 2013–2014: Paços de Ferreira
- 2014–2015: Chaves
- 2015–2019: Abambres

Senior career*
| Years | Team | Apps | (Gls) |
| 2019–2021 | Abambres | 37 | (8) |
| 2021–2022 | Santa Marta | 22 | (5) |
| 2022–2023 | Felgueiras | 3 | (0) |
| 2023 | → Pedras Salgadas (loan) | 14 | (3) |
| 2023–2024 | Portosantense | 14 | (5) |
| 2024 | Amarante | 15 | (5) |
| 2024–2026 | Atlético CP | 50 | (9) |
| 2026– | Cherno More | 10 | (0) |
- * Club domestic league appearances and goals as of 13 October 2026

Duarte Miguel da Silva Barandas (born 10 April 2000) is a Portuguese professional footballer who plays as a winger for Bulgarian First League club Cherno More Varna.

== Career ==
Born in Vila Real, Barandas played youth football for Abambres, Paços de Ferreira and Chaves. In 2019–20 season he made his senior debut for Abambres. On 8 July 2022, he signed with Liga 3 club Felgueiras. He made only three league appearances for the club and spent time on loan at Campeonato de Portugal club Juventude de Pedras Salgadas.

In July 2024, Barandas joined Atlético Clube de Portugal. In his two seasons at the club he made 50 league appearances and scored 9 goals in the Liga 3.

On 2 July 2026, Barandas signed a contract with Bulgarian First League club Cherno More Varna.
