= Lozan Kotsev =

Bulgarian footballer and manager (1911–1991)

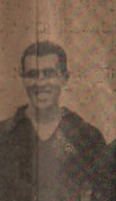

Personal information
- Full name: Lozan Vladimirov Kotsev
- Date of birth: 8 February 1911
- Place of birth: Sofia, Bulgaria
- Date of death: 14 June 1991 (aged 80)
- Place of death: Bulgaria
- Position: Forward

Senior career*
Years	Team	Apps	(Gls)
1934–1935	Borislav Sofia	?	(?)
1931–1934	FK-13	?	(?)
1935–1936	Lausanne-Sport	7	(4)
1936–1939	FK-13	22	(10)

International career
1935	Bulgaria	1	(0)

Managerial career
- 1952–1954: Air Forces
- 1957–1959: Septemvri
- 1960–1962: Cherno More
- 1962–1965: Sudan
- 1967–1968: Singapore
- 1972–1973: Beroe
- 1974: Egaleo
Medal record
Men's football
Representing Sudan (as manager)
Africa Cup of Nations
Runner-up	1963 Ghana
Arab Games
Silver medal – second place	1965 Cairo
- * Club domestic league appearances and goals

Lozan Kotsev (Bulgarian: Лозан Коцев; 8 February 1911 - 14 June 1991) was a Bulgarian footballer and manager. He is the first Bulgarian ever to play abroad professionally and the first to win a championship with a foreign club.

== Career ==
=== Playing career ===
Kotsev began his playing career with Borislav (Sofia) and then FK-13, before signing with Swiss side Lausanne-Sport in 1935, becoming the first Bulgarian to play abroad, and helping them win the league title in 1936.

=== Managerial career ===
From 1957 until 1959, Kotsev managed Septemvri Sofia. In 1960, he was appointed manager of Cherno More. After that, he was hired as manager of Sudan, with whom he reached the final of the African Cup in 1963. He later managed Singapore for one year before returning to Bulgaria. In 1972, he was appointed manager of Beroe. His last appointment as a coach was in November 1974, when he spent a month and a half at the helm of Greek side Egaleo.

== Honours ==
=== Player ===
FC Lausanne-Sport

- Champions, 1936

FK-13

- Bulgarian Cup, 1938

=== Manager ===
Sudan

- Runner-up, 1963 African Cup of Nations
- Silver medal, 1965 Arab Games
