= Ľudovít Rado =

Slovak footballer (1914–1992)

Personal information
- Full name: Ľudovít Rado
- Date of birth: 27 July 1914
- Place of birth: Pressburg, Austria-Hungary
- Date of death: 23 May 1992 (aged 77)
- Position: Defender

Senior career*
Years	Team	Apps	(Gls)
193?–1936	DSV Saaz		
1936–1939	Sparta Prague		
1939–1944	ŠK Bratislava		

International career
1934–1938	Czechoslovakia	2	(0)
1940–1942	Slovakia	10	(0)
- * Club domestic league appearances and goals

Ľudovít Rado (27 July 1914 – 23 May 1992) was a Slovak footballer who played as a defender and appeared for both the Czechoslovakia and Slovakia national teams.

== Career ==
Rado made his international debut for Czechoslovakia on 25 March 1934 in a friendly match against France, which finished as a 2–1 win in Colombes. He earned his second and final cap on 24 April 1938 in a 1938 World Cup qualifying fixture against Bulgaria. He missed a penalty in the match, which finished as a 6–0 win in Prague. He later represented the Slovakia national team, making his first appearance on 6 June 1940 in a friendly against Bulgaria, which finished as a 4–1 win in Sofia. He was capped ten times for Slovakia, making his final appearance on 22 November 1942 in a friendly match against Germany, which finished as a 2–5 loss in Bratislava.

== Personal life ==
Rado died on 23 May 1992 at the age of 77.

== Career statistics ==
=== International ===
Team	Year	Apps	Goals
Czechoslovakia	1934	1	0
Czechoslovakia	1938	1	0
Czechoslovakia	Total	2	0
Slovakia	1940	2	0
Slovakia	1941	4	0
Slovakia	1942	4	0
Slovakia	Total	10	0
Career total		12	0
