= Giorgos Pontikou =

Cypriot footballer (born 2003)

Personal information
- Full name: Giorgos Pontikou
- Date of birth: 8 January 2003 (age 23)
- Place of birth: Larnaca, Cyprus
- Height: 1.72 m (5 ft 8 in)
- Position: Winger

Team information
- Current team: Cherno More
- Number: 75

Youth career
- –2019: Omonia
- 2019–2021: Eintracht Frankfurt

Senior career*
Years	Team	Apps	(Gls)
2022–2024	Apollon Limassol	19	(0)
2022	→ Doxa Katokopias (loan)	5	(0)
2024–2025	PAC Omonia 29M	19	(1)
2025–2026	Nea Salamis Famagusta	13	(0)
2026–	Cherno More	0	(0)

International career^{‡}
2019	Cyprus U17	2	(0)
2021	Cyprus U19	6	(0)
2022–	Cyprus U21	4	(0)
- * Club domestic league appearances and goals as of 3 May 2026 ‡ National team caps and goals as of 20 June 2024

Giorgos Pontikou (Greek: Γιώργος Ποντικού; born 8 January 2003) is a Cypriot professional footballer who plays as a winger for Bulgarian First League club Cherno More Varna.

== Career statistics ==
As of 28 May 2023

Club	Season	League			Cup		Continental		Other		Total	
Club	Season	Division	Apps	Goals	Apps	Goals	Apps	Goals	Apps	Goals	Apps	Goals
Apollon Limassol	2021–22	Cypriot First Division	0	0	0	0	—		—		0	0
Apollon Limassol	2022–23	Cypriot First Division	1	0	0	0	0	0	0	0	1	0
Apollon Limassol	Total		1	0	0	0	0	0	0	0	1	0
Doxa Katokopias (loan)	2021–22	Cypriot First Division	5	0	1	0	—		—		6	0
Career total			6	0	1	0	0	0	0	0	7	0
