= Dimitar Bosnov =

Bulgarian footballer

Dimitar Bosnov (Bulgarian: Димитър Боснов; 12 February 1933 - 17 March 2012) was a defender for Cherno More Varna from 1955 to 1970. He played 343 matches in the top Bulgarian division.

Bosnov died in Varna on 17 March 2012 aged 79.
