= Luciano Squadrone =

Argentine footballer

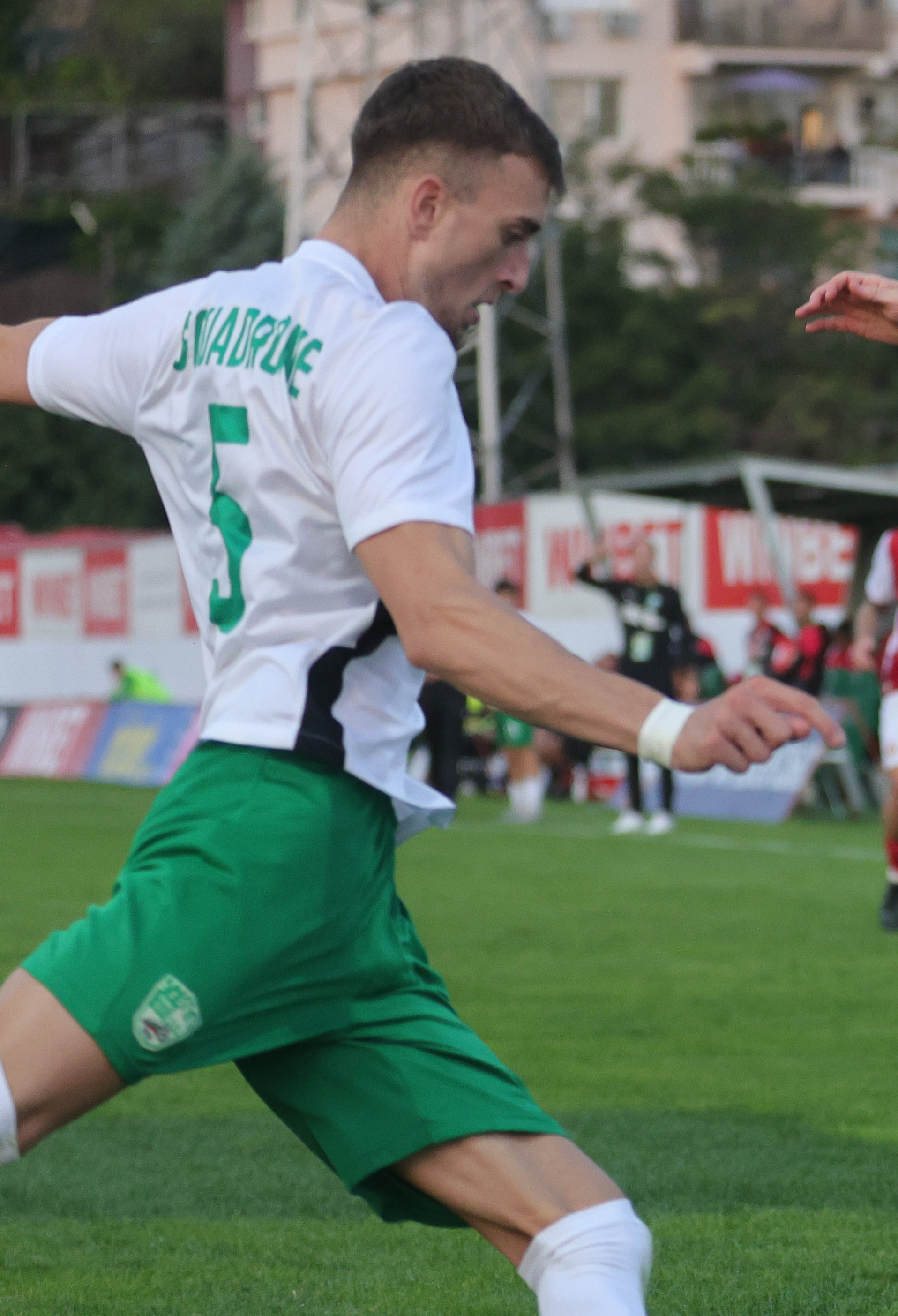

Personal information
- Full name: Luciano Gastón Squadrone
- Date of birth: 18 November 1999 (age 26)
- Place of birth: Cipolletti, Río Negro, Argentina
- Height: 1.85 m (6 ft 1 in)
- Position: Centre-back

Team information
- Current team: Cherno More
- Number: 5

Youth career
- –2014: ADIP
- 2014–2020: Estudiantes

Senior career*
Years	Team	Apps	(Gls)
2020–2022	Estudiantes	0	(0)
2021–2022	→ Poli El Ejido (loan)	31	(1)
2022–2023	Linares	13	(0)
2023–2025	Beroe	58	(4)
2025–2026	Flamurtari	28	(0)
2026–	Cherno More	9	(1)
- * Club domestic league appearances and goals as of 05:53, 13 October 2026 (UTC)

Luciano Gastón Squadrone (born 18 November 1999) is an Argentine professional footballer who plays as a centre-back for Bulgarian First League club Cherno More.

== Career ==
Luciano is a son of Leonardo Squadrone, a former defender of Estudiantes de La Plata, Huracán and New England Revolution. He joined Estudiantes's youth system from Asociación Deportiva Infantil Platense in 2014.

On 14 July 2021, Squadrone joined Spanish Segunda B club Poli El Ejido on a season-long loan until the end of the 2021–22 season. On 16 July 2022, he signed with Primera Federación club Linares Deportivo.

On 30 June 2023, Squadrone signed a two-year contract with Bulgarian First League club Beroe Stara Zagora. He made his debut on 14 July 2023 in a 2–1 away win over Pirin Blagoevgrad. In his two seasons at the club he made 58 league appearances and scored 4 goals.

After his contract with Beroe expired, Squadrone signed as a free agent with Albanian club Flamurtari on 26 July 2025. At the end of the 2025–26 season, Flamurtari were relegated to the second tier of Albanian football and he left the club.

On 1 July 2026, Squadrone returned to Bulgaria, signing a two-year contract with Cherno More.
