= Todor Marev =

Bulgarian footballer

Personal information
- Full name: Todor Boychev Marev
- Date of birth: 20 November 1954 (age 71)
- Place of birth: Burgas, Bulgaria
- Height: 1.83 m (6 ft 0 in)
- Position: Defender

Team information
- Current team: Cherno More (Manager of the reserve team)

Senior career*
Years	Team	Apps	(Gls)
1972–1990	Cherno More	512	(4)
1990–1992	Dorostol Silistra	64	(—)
1992–1993	Ovech Provadia	32	(-)
1993–1994	Cherno More	12	(0)

International career
1974–1983	Bulgaria	16	(0)

Managerial career
- 1993-1994: Cherno More (player-assistant)
- 1994–1997: FC Grand Hotel Varna
- 1997–1998: Cherno More
- 1998–: Cherno More Reserves and Academy
- * Club domestic league appearances and goals

Todor Marev (Bulgarian: Тодор Марев), (born on 20 November 1954) is a former Bulgarian footballer. He played in the center of the defence for Cherno More Varna (1972-1990, 1994), Dorostol Silistra and Ovech Provadia (1990-1993). Marev was capped 16 times for the Bulgaria national team, 6 times for the Olympic team and 26 times for the U18 team of his country, with which he won the Balkan championship cup played in Thessaloniki in 1969. Todor Marev was voted Best player of Varna in 3 consecutive years (1976, 1977, 1978).

== Club career ==
Marev was born in Burgas but he grew up and spent all his life in Varna. He went through all youth formations of Cherno More and is considered one of the greatest talents the club has ever raised. He was introduced to Group A football by coaches Ivan Mokanov and Georgi Dimitrov, making his debut at the age of 17, on 4 June 1972 in a match against Dunav Ruse. He established himself as a leader at the center of the defence becoming one of the youngest skippers in Group A football aged only 22. Marev was known for his faultless tackles, positioning abilities and speed. Under his leadership the Cherno More defence was one of the hardest to beat in Group A. Only ones in his career, Marev was red carded. It was in the last minutes of one of his last competitive games on 6 April 1994 in a brusque Varna derby which saw a total of 4 players sent off. Marev took little to no part in the attacking phase of the game. He scored only 2 goals in his career, the first and most memorable one coming against local rivals Spartak on 29 September 1985, sealing a 3-0 victory for “The Sailors”. Todor Marev played a total of 530 matches for Cherno More (422 in Group A and 108 in Group B) which is a record in Bulgarian football. He played 3 seasons in the lower divisions for Dorostol Silistra and Ovech Provadia before making a brief return to Cherno More as a playing assistant coach under manager Stefan Bogomilov in the spring of 1994. On 13 August 1994, at the age of 39, he put an end to his playing career.

== International career ==
Todor Marev was selected for the Bulgarian A team by manager Stoyan Ormandzhiev and made his debut in Genoa on 22 December 1974 in a friendly against Italy (0-0). He made a total of 16 appearances, the last one being a match against Switzerland, played in Varna on 9 March 1983 (1-1).

== Coaching career ==
Marev graduated from the University of Economics (Varna) in 1983 and also took a course in the National Sports academy (Sofia), receiving a coaching degree in 1995. He coached the female football side of Grand hotel Varna to 3 successive National championship titles after which he dedicated his coaching career to the youth teams of Cherno More. For a brief period in 1998, Marev took charge of the first team when the club was in deep trouble facing relegation to 3d division (Group “V”). From the following season to date, Marev works as a coach with the Cherno More youth academy.

== Career statistics ==
Club	Season		League		KSA		Bulgarian Cup		Continental		Total	
Club	Season		Apps	Goals	Apps	Goals	Apps	Goals	Apps	Goals	Apps	Goals
Cherno More	A Group	1971–72	6	0	0	0	0	0	0	0	6	0
Cherno More	A Group	1972–73	29	0	0	0	0	0	0	0	29	0
Cherno More	A Group	1973–74	30	0	3	0	0	0	0	0	33	0
Cherno More	A Group	1974–75	28	0	4	0	0	0	0	0	32	0
Cherno More	A Group	1975–76	29	0	2	0	0	0	0	0	31	0
Cherno More	B Group	1976–77	36	0	1	0	0	0	0	0	37	0
Cherno More	A Group	1977–78	28	0	2	0	0	0	0	0	30	0
Cherno More	A Group	1978–79	29	1	3	0	0	0	0	0	32	1
Cherno More	A Group	1979–80	23	0	5	2	0	0	0	0	28	2
Cherno More	A Group	1980–81	19	0	1	0	6	0	0	0	27	0
Cherno More	A Group	1981–82	29	0	2	0	9	0	0	0	40	0
Cherno More	A Group	1982–83	30	0	1	0	10	0	6	0	41	0
Cherno More	A Group	1983–84	29	0	2	0	9	0	0	0	40	0
Cherno More	A Group	1984–85	28	0	4	0	11	0	0	0	43	0
Cherno More	A Group	1985–86	26	1	1	0	1	0	0	0	28	1
Cherno More	B Group	1986–87	31	1	2	0	7	0	0	0	40	1
Cherno More	B Group	1987–88	36	1	6	0	4	0	0	0	46	1
Cherno More	A Group	1988–89	24	0	1	0	0	0	0	0	25	0
Cherno More	A Group	1989–90	25	0	2	0	2	0	0	0	29	0
Cherno More	A Group	1993–94	12	0	0	0	0	0	0	0	12	0
Career total			527	4	42	2	59	0	6	0	634	6
