= Nikolay Kostadinov =

Bulgarian footballer (2005)

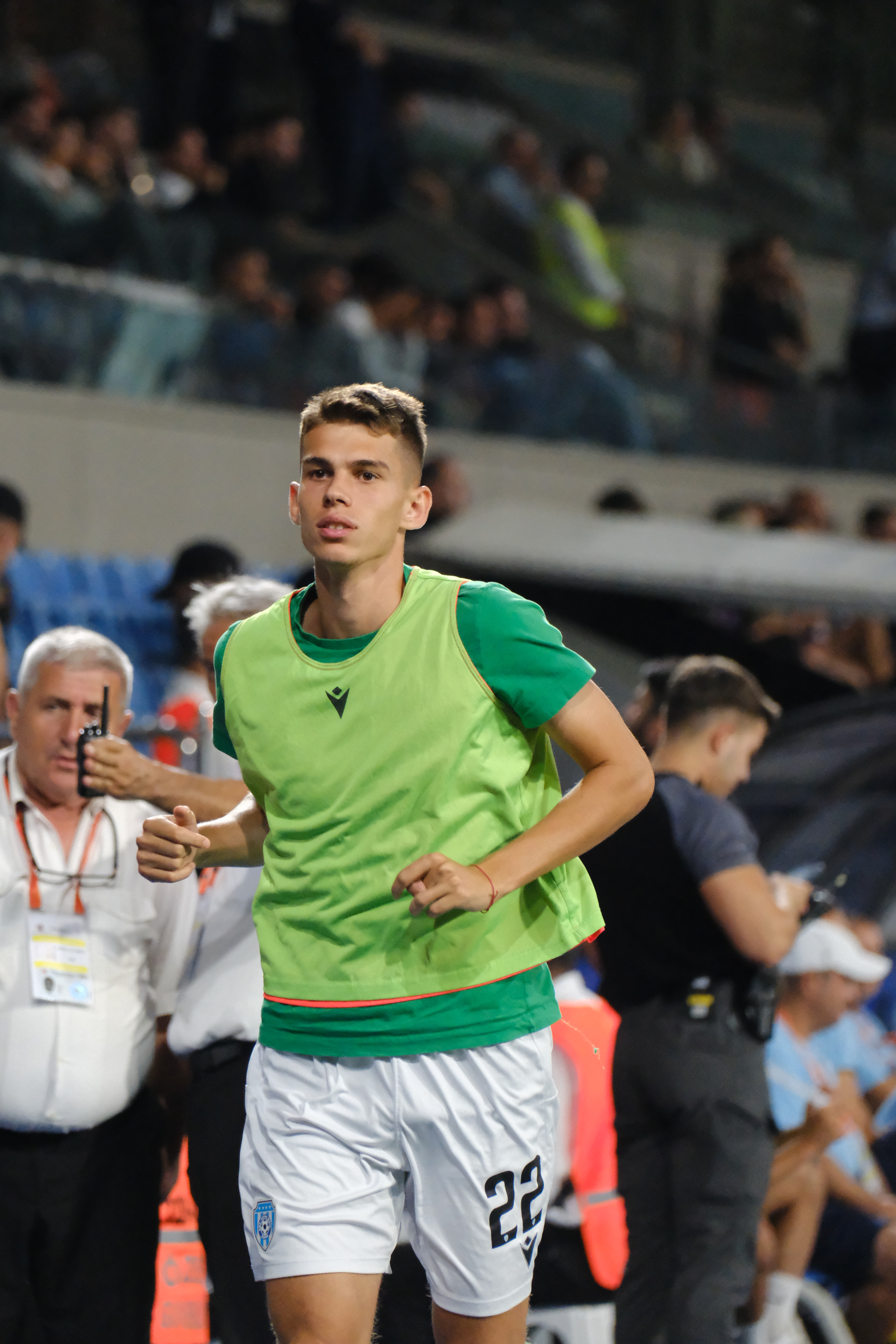

Personal information
- Full name: Nikolay Petrov Kostadinov
- Date of birth: 28 July 2005 (age 21)
- Place of birth: Varna, Bulgaria
- Height: 1.84 m (6 ft 0 in)
- Position: Midfielder

Team information
- Current team: Cherno More II
- Number: 22

Youth career
- 2009–2017: Beroe
- 2017–2022: Cherno More

Senior career*
Years	Team	Apps	(Gls)
2022–2023	Chernomorets Balchik	15	(2)
2023–	Cherno More II	53	(8)
2024–	Cherno More	4	(0)
- * Club domestic league appearances and goals

Nikolay Kostadinov (Bulgarian: Николай Костадинов) is a Bulgarian professional footballer who plays for Cherno More and for Cherno More II. He is the son of Cherno More's assistant manager Petar Kostadinov.

== Career ==
Nikolay Kostadinov started playing football at the age of 4. He began his footballing career at Beroe. He played there 8 years after moving to Cherno More at the age of 12 in the end of 2017. After 5 years there he went to Chernomorets Balchik where he for the first time played men's football. After 1 year he returned to Cherno More and started playing for Cherno More II. He signed his first professional contract in the summer of 2024. He made his debut for Cherno More in the 30 October 2024 in a 4:0 away win in the Bulgarian Cup against Kyustendil. On 6 December 2025 Kostadinov made his league debut for Cherno More against CSKA Sofia in a 2-0 win coming on in the last minute.

== Career statistics ==
As of 6 December 2025

Club	League	Season	League		Cup		Continental		Other		Total	
Club	League	Season	Apps	Goals	Apps	Goals	Apps	Goals	Apps	Goals	Apps	Goals
Chernomorets Balchik	Third League	2022–23	15	2	—		—		—		15	2
Cherno More II	Third League	2023–24	25	4	—		—		—		25	4
Cherno More II	Third League	2024–25	21	2	—		—		—		21	2
Cherno More II	Third League	2025–26	10	3	—		—		—		10	3
Cherno More II	Total		56	9	0	0	0	0	0	0	56	9
Cherno More	First League	2024–25	0	0	1	0	0	0	—		1	0
Cherno More	First League	2025–26	1	0	0	0	0	0	—		1	0
Cherno More	Total		1	0	1	0	0	0	0	0	2	0
Career total			72	11	2	0	0	0	0	0	74	11
