= Anastas Kovachev =

Bulgarian footballer (1910–1997)

Personal information
- Date of birth: 16 October 1910
- Date of death: 11 December 1997 (aged 87)

International career
Years	Team	Apps	(Gls)
1934–1937	Bulgaria	11	(0)

Anastas Kovachev (16 October 1910 – 11 December 1997) was a Bulgarian footballer. He played in eleven matches for the Bulgaria national football team from 1934 to 1937. He was also part of Bulgaria's team for their qualification matches for the 1938 FIFA World Cup.
