= Spas Kirov =

Bulgarian footballer (1933–2001)

Personal information
- Full name: Spas Petrov Kirov
- Date of birth: 26 May 1933
- Place of birth: Varna, Bulgaria
- Date of death: 22 March 2001 (aged 67)
- Place of death: Varna, Bulgaria
- Positions: Right winger; left winger

Youth career
- 1948: Torpedo
- 1949–1950: Academic
- 1950–1953: Cherno More

Senior career*
Years	Team	Apps	(Gls)
1953–1965	Cherno More	213	(40)
Total		213	(40)

International career
	Bulgaria B	1	(0)

Managerial career
- 1968–1970: Cherno More (assistant manager)
- 1972–1973: Cherno More
- 1975–1977: Dobrudzha Dobrich
- 1979–1980: Chernomorets Balchik
- 1980–1981: Svetkavitsa Targovishte
- 1981–1983: Cherno More
- 1983–1985: Sportist General Toshevo
- 1985–1986: Cherno More
- * Club domestic league appearances and goals

Spas Kirov (Bulgarian: Спас Киров; 26 May 1933 – 22 March 2001) was a Bulgarian football player and coach who spent most of his career with Cherno More.

== Club career ==
Kirov began playing organized football in the youth team of "Torpedo" in 1948. Then he passed through "Akademik" and landed at the "Sailors". One of the most talented products of the club's school. In 1951 he was a leading player of the youth team, which reached the top 4 of the Republican Youth Championship. However, in the semi-final against "Cherveno Zname" (Gabrovo) on 28 October 1951, he missed a penalty, and subsequently the "Sailors" were eliminated after a 0:2 loss.

Then he entered the Higher Naval School as a cadet. At the beginning of 1953 he was recruited to the representative team. He made his debut for it on 22 March 1953, when "Miner" was visiting in a match of "A" RFG, lost 2:3. He appeared on the field as a reserve in place of Nikola Popov and was distinguished by strong performances. In the 70th minute he scored a goal from a direct free kick. By the end of the season he recorded a total of 12 matches with 5 goals in the elite championship. This made him the team's No. 2 scorer for the year after Vasil Dosev, as well as the most effective striker of the "sailors" with an average of 0.42 goals per match.

In the 1954 season, Kirov played 17 games with 2 goals in the "A" RFG, and in 1955 he played 24 games and scored 4 goals. Because of his sprinting skills during a match broadcast on Radio Sofia, the commentator said: "Kirov surpasses himself in speed".

He retained his status as the team's main player for 10 years. In 1957, he was elected captain of the "sailors", holding this position for about two years. In November 1959, he handed over the baton to Georgi Dimitrov - the Red, who had returned from the Central Military District, and remained the team's second captain.

On 27 June 1959, Kirov scored his first goal in an international match – in a 1:0 away win against the Hungarian "Textil" (Papa). On 19 July 1959, he scored a 3:0 victory in Varna against another Hungarian club – "Epitok" (Budapest).

In the 1960/61 season, he became the No. 1 scorer for the “Sailors” in the elite championship with 10 goals in 26 matches. On 25 December 1960, he scored 4 goals in a 5:1 victory against “Septemvri” (Sofia). In the 1961/62 season, he scored 6 goals in 23 matches in the master group. On 18 April 1962, he was on target for the prestigious 1:1 draw against the USSR champion “Dynamo” (Kiev). He scored the goal in his typical style – he received a pass from deep on the flank, quickly advanced, overcame the opponent's left back and with a measured shot left no chances for the goalkeeper of the Kiev team.

Kirov began to lose his starting place during the 1963/64 season, when Simeon Nikolov arrived in the team. He recorded only 12 matches with 1 goal in the "A" RFG. He scored on 15 March 1964 in a 2:0 home win against "Beroe", which turned out to be his last goal in the elite championship. In the middle of the 1964/65 season, in which he played only 2 matches, he ended his competitive career. This happened to some extent by force.

On 3 October 1964, “Cherno More” defeated its “older brother” in the military line, CSKA Cherveno Zname 2:1 in the middle of Sofia – an “audacity” that angered the responsible factors in the Ministry of Defense, under whose umbrella both clubs are. Soon after, as a punishment, “Sailors” were demilitarized and became a civilian club. In this way, they lost the opportunity to take the football players fictitiously to work as midshipmen in the navy and many players remained unemployed. Kirov's official retirement from competitive football was celebrated a few months later. This happened on 23 June 1965, before the Balkan Cup match against Rapid (Bucharest) at the Yuri Gagarin Stadium. He was then solemnly "sent off" in a modest ceremony, during which he ritually handed over the No. 7 shirt to his successor, Andrei Stoyanov, to the thunderous applause of the audience.

== Playing style ==
On the field, he shows himself with speed and technique. He is also extremely well-read and intelligent. "He relied mostly on his speed, he didn't have any special tricks to jump around the ball. He would pass it forward and get ahead of the defender. He also had a good finishing shot," his teammate Argir Strakov remembers about him.

== Coaching career ==
In January 1968, he was appointed assistant coach of "Cherno More" in the staff of Georgi Dimitrov - Cherveniya. He held this position for two and a half years. He left in the summer of 1970, after some of the players organized a rebellion against Georgi Dimitrov. Unhappy with his methods, the players issued an ultimatum to dismiss the head coach, otherwise threatening to deliberately lose matches. In the end, Cherveniya kept his position, but the management dismissed Kirov, as he was accused of taking the side of the "rebels".

In the next two years he worked as a lecturer at the Higher Naval School. He also graduated from the coaching school in Sofia. He returned to the "Black Sea" in the summer of 1972, when he was appointed as a coach of the "Sailors". Under the leadership of Kirov in the 1972/73 season, the team finished in 10th place in the final standings of the "A" RFG. He remained at the head of the team at the beginning of the next season 1973/74, but in October 1973 he was replaced by the experienced Ivan Mokanov.

After parting ways with Cherno More, Kirov worked as a head coach in several clubs in Northeastern Bulgaria. Between 1975 and 1981, he successively managed Dobrudzha, Vatev (Beloslav), Chernomorets (Balchik) and Svetkavitsa. In the summer of 1981, he was appointed coach of the Sailors for the second time.
