= Yuri Gagarin Stadium =

Multi-purpose stadium in Varna, Bulgaria

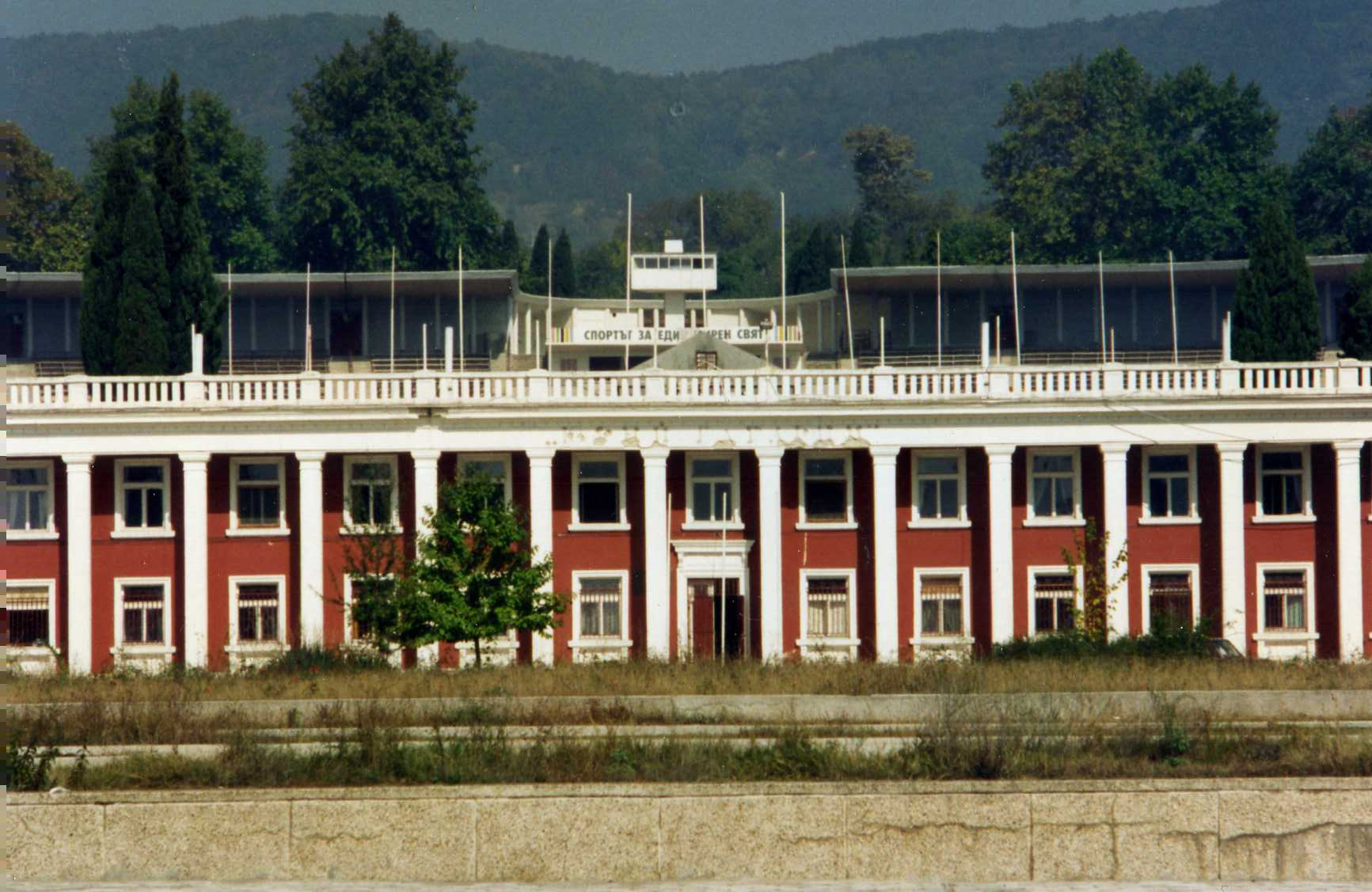
- Interactive map of Yuri Gagarin Stadium
- Full name: Yuri Gagarin Stadium
- Location: Varna, Bulgaria
- Coordinates: 43°13′16″N 27°56′35″E
- Capacity: 40,000

Construction
- Opened: 1957
- Closed: 2007
- Demolished: 2008

Tenants
- PFC Cherno More Varna; PFC Spartak Varna (UEFA matches)

Yuri Gagarin Stadium was a multi-purpose stadium in Varna, Bulgaria. It was initially used as the stadium of Cherno More Varna and Spartak Varna. It was named after Soviet cosmonaut Yuri Gagarin. It will be replaced with a new stadium that was due to open in 2018, but is currently on hold. The capacity of the stadium was 40,000 spectators. The stadium was demolished in 2007.
