= Arnošt Kreuz =

Czech footballer (1912–1974)

Personal information
- Date of birth: 9 May 1912
- Place of birth: Neštěmice (Ústí nad Labem), Austria-Hungary
- Date of death: 9 February 1974 (aged 61)
- Place of death: Harksheide (Norderstedt), West Germany
- Position: Forward

Youth career
- DSK Brüx

Senior career*
Years	Team	Apps	(Gls)
1929-1933	Teplitzer FK		
1933-1934	AC Sparta Prague		
1935-1936	DFC Prague		
1937-1941	SK Pardubice		

International career
1931–1938	Czechoslovakia	3	(0)
- * Club domestic league appearances and goals

Arnošt Kreuz (or Ernst Kreuz, 9 May 1912 – 9 February 1974), was a Czech football forward of German ethnicity who played for Czechoslovakia in the 1938 FIFA World Cup.

== FIFA World Cup Career ==
National team	Year	Apps	Goals
Czechoslovakia	1938	2	0
