= FK 13 Sofia =

Futbol Klub 13
- Full name: Futbol Klub 13 Sofia
- Nickname: The Veterans
- Founded: 1909; 117 years ago
- Dissolved: 1944; 82 years ago
Home colours	Away colours

Futbol Klub 13 (Bulgarian: Футбол клуб 13), commonly known as FK-13, was a Bulgarian football club based in Sofia that existed between 1909 and 1944. FK-13 holds a notable place in Bulgarian history as the first ever football club in the country.

== History ==
In the Spring of 1909, a group of thirteen Bulgarian students at the Galatasaray Lyceum in Constantinople formed a football team in the honor of their classmate Sava Kirov, who was one of the pioneers of sports in Sofia.

A number of those students, having returned to Sofia following the completion of their studies, officially registered the club in October 1913 and named it FK-13, after the original 13 students who formed the team in 1909.

In the early years, Sava Kirov concurrently served as team captain (playing as a forward), secretary, treasurer, and chairman until 1920. There were 12 children's teams associated with the club.

The club's home ground was located in the so-called Aligina Mahala, on the site of the old Russian cemetery, next to where the Vasil Levski Stadium stands today.

In the Summer of 1928, the municipal authorities confiscated the pitch and combined it with the neighboring plot of the Yunak sports association.

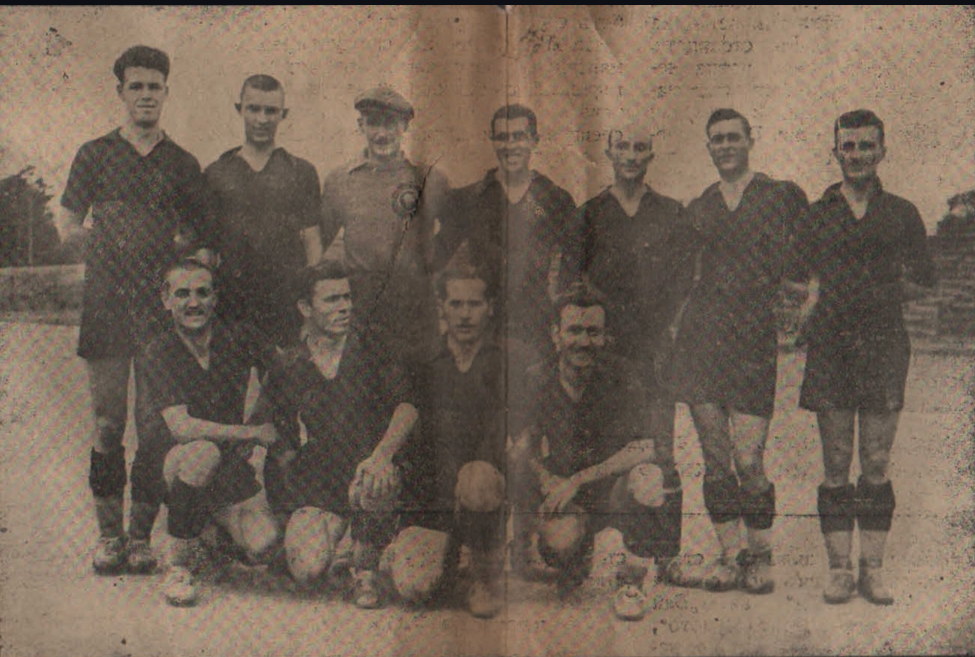
FK-13 in 1935

Apart from being the winner of the first iteration of the Bulgarian Cup in 1938 and another in 1940, FK-13 also produced 16 players for the national team, the most prominent of these being Todor Mistelov, who helped Bulgaria win the Balkan Cup. Other notable players included goalkeeper Nikola Savov, who was named number one player under 20 on the Balkan Peninsula in 1935, Lozan Kotsev, who became champion of Switzerland with FC Lausanne-Sport in 1936, and Austrian Friedrich Klid, who made history by being the first foreigner ever to play for a club in Bulgaria when he joined FK-13.

In later years, FK-13 developed volleyball, basketball, and ice hockey teams. The club existed independently until 3 October 1944, when it was merged with FC Rakovski.

According to FIFA, FK-13 is the 34^{th} oldest football club in the world.

== Honours ==
Bulgarian Cup:

- Winners (2): 1938, 1940

Ulpia Serdica Cup:

- Runners-up (4): 1930, 1931, 1935, 1937

Sofia First Division:

- Champions (1): 1941

National Division:

- 4th place (1): 1938

State Championship:

- 5th place (1): 1941
