= Damyan Georgiev =

Bulgarian footballer (1950–2022)

Personal information
- Full name: Damyan Georgiev Dimitrov
- Date of birth: 12 January 1950
- Place of birth: Varna, Bulgaria
- Date of death: 7 May 2022 (aged 72)
- Place of death: Orlando, United States
- Position: Winger

Senior career*
Years	Team	Apps	(Gls)
1968–1978	Cherno More	245	(63)

International career
1968–1969	Bulgaria U18	11	(4)
1969–1973	Bulgaria U23	16	(3)
1969	Bulgaria	1	(0)

Managerial career
- 1980–1990: Cherno More (youth)
- * Club domestic league appearances and goals

Damyan Georgiev (Bulgarian: Дамян Георгиев; 12 January 1950 – 7 May 2022) was a Bulgarian footballer, who played for Cherno More Varna from 1968 to 1978. He played 215 matches and scored 55 goals in the Bulgarian top division. For Bulgaria U19, Georgiev was capped 11 times, scoring 4 goals. He represented Bulgaria at the 1969 UEFA European Under-18 Championship in Germany. Georgiev also was capped 16 times and scored 3 goals for Bulgaria U21.

== Coaching career ==
Throughout his career Damyan Georgiev has been the manager of the following football teams : Cherno More Varna and amateurs Ovech Provadia, Botev Novi Pazar and Lokomotiv Kaspichan.
