= Borislav Kamenski =

Bulgarian footballer

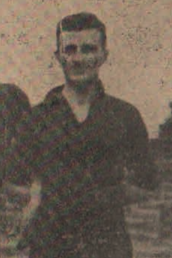

Personal information
- Date of birth: 1911
- Date of death: 26 January 1990 (aged 78–79)

International career
Years	Team	Apps	(Gls)
1931–1940	Bulgaria	9	(0)

Borislav Kamenski (1911 – 26 January 1990) was a Bulgarian footballer. He played in nine matches for the Bulgaria national football team from 1931 to 1940. He was also part of Bulgaria's team for their qualification matches for the 1938 FIFA World Cup.

At club level he played for FC 13 (Sofia).
