= Nikola Nikolov (footballer) =

Bulgarian footballer (1908–1996)

Personal information
- Date of birth: 25 January 1908
- Date of death: 27 April 1996 (aged 88)
- Position: Defender

Senior career*
| Years | Team | Apps | (Gls) |
| 1927 - 1940 | Levski Sofia | 141 | (1) |

International career
| 1929–1938 | Bulgaria | 19 | (0) |
- * Club domestic league appearances and goals

Nikola Nikolov (25 January 1908 – 27 April 1996) was a Bulgarian footballer who played as a defender for Levski Sofia. He made 19 appearances for the Bulgaria national team from 1929 to 1938. He was also part of Bulgaria's team for their qualification matches for the 1938 FIFA World Cup.
