= Stefan Bogomilov =

Bulgarian footballer

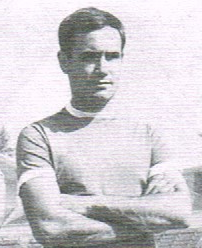

Personal information
- Full name: Stefan Bogomilov Atanasov
- Date of birth: 11 April 1945 (age 81)
- Place of birth: Varna, Bulgaria
- Position: Striker

Youth career
- Cherno More

Senior career*
Years	Team	Apps	(Gls)
1962–1976	Cherno More	346	(162)
1976–1977	Vatev Beloslav	–	(–)

International career
1965–1966	Bulgaria U21	5	(2)
1973	Bulgaria	5	(1)

Managerial career
- 1992–1993: Aljazeera Zuwara
- 1994: Cherno More
- * Club domestic league appearances and goals

Stefan Bogomilov (Bulgarian: Стефан Богомилов; born 11 April 1945) is a former Bulgarian footballer who played as a striker.

Stefan Bogomilov played top level Bulgarian football with Cherno More Varna for 14 years (1962-1976) and holds the goal scoring record of the team with 162 goals in 346 matches. Currently, he stands 8th in the all-time top scorers table of the Bulgarian A Group competition. Bogomilov has scored twice 4 goals in a single match, on 11 September 1966 against Dobrudzha (6-2) and on 22 August 1971 against Marek (5-1). He was capped 5 times for the National team and scored 1 goal. Bogomilov won the Best player of Varna award in 1975.

== Club career ==
Stefan Bogomilov made his first appearance for the A team of “The Sailors” on 21 October 1962 against local rivals Spartak, at the age of 17. He quickly established himself in the left flank of the attack and wore the number 11 jersey for most of his career. Stefan showed remarkable skills in heading the ball. He headed 44 of his 162 goals which is a unique record in Bulgarian football. Bogomilov was also the regulair penalty taker of the team. He scored 27 times from the penalty spot and was known to have missed only ones in the A Group competition in a match against Botev Vratza. One more time he missed a penalty in a friendly against Coventry City at Highfield Road (1-1) on 10 August 1966. Bogomilov was approached on two occasions with lucrative offers to join Sofia clubs Slavia and Levski which was considered a great privilege in communist Bulgaria but he refused to leave his native Varna. He spent most of his last season with Cherno More injured and scored his last goal for the team in Varna on 17 April 1976 against Dunav Ruse (4-2). In June, Cherno More ended second from bottom and was relegated in Group B. Bogomilov was released from the club due to his frequent injuries and advanced age. He had a short spell with another Group B team, Vatev Beloslav, and headed the equalizer in the Vatev vs Cherno More game (1-1). This was the last season of his playing career.

== International career ==
Stefan was capped 5 times for the Bulgarian U21 team making his debut on 5 September 1965 in Frankfurt (Oder) against GDR. He was selected for the A national team and took part in the preparations for the World Cup finals in West Germany'74, making his debut in Jakarta against Indonesia (0-4) on 4 February 1973. Bogomilov scored the first goal for a 3-1 victory against Australia in Adelaide on 16 February 1973.

== Coaching career ==
Stefan Bogomilov coached different teams from Group V, the third level of the Bulgarian football competition. In 1992, he signed a one-year contract with the Libyan 2nd Division team Aljazeera Zoara with which he won the Cup of Libya. This was his biggest achievement in his coaching career. Bogomilov returned to Varna and coached the youth teams of Cherno More until 2002.
