= PFC Cherno More Varna =

Association football club

Cherno More
- Full name: Професионален Футболен Клуб Черно море Варна (Professional Football Club Cherno more Varna)
- Nickname: Моряците (The Sailors)
- Short name: Черно море (Cherno More)
- Founded: 3 March 1913; 113 years ago
- Ground: Stadion Ticha
- Capacity: 8,250
- Owner: Chimimport
- Chairman: Plamen Andreev
- Head coach: Ilian Iliev
- League: First League
- 2025–26: First League, 7th of 16
- Website: chernomorepfc.bg
Home colours	Away colours	Third colours

Cherno More (Bulgarian: Черно море) is a Bulgarian professional association football club based in the city of Varna, which currently competes in Bulgaria's primary football competition, the First League. Founded on 3 March 1913, as an association football branch of the larger sports society SC Galata, the club has spent the majority of its existence playing in the top tier of Bulgarian football. Cherno More is named after the Black Sea, and the football club is also known by its nickname The Sailors.

Cherno More's home ground is the Stadion Ticha, which has a seating capacity of 8,250 spectators, with plans to move to a new all-seater stadium by 2028. As one of the relatively successful clubs in Bulgarian football outside the capital Sofia, the Sailors have won the Bulgarian championship on four occasions, the Bulgarian Cup once in 2015 and the Bulgarian Supercup too once in 2015.

The club has a long-standing rivalry with neighbouring Spartak Varna, with matches between the two being commonly referred to as The Derby of Varna.

== History ==
=== Early years ===
On 3 March 1913, Galata Sports Association was established in the first male high school in Varna, with association football being one of its departments. Later in 1913, Karel Škorpil, one of the founding members of the sports society and a prominent Czech-Bulgarian archaeologist, who settled in Varna at that time, suggested the association to be renamed to Reka Ticha, in homage of the old name of the Kamchiya river. On May 24, 1914, Sportist Sports Club, which was formed by Stefan Tonchev and a group of boys in 1909, joined Reka Ticha. Many Cherno More supporters today consider the officially acknowledged founding year 1913 to be historically incorrect, believing that SC Sportist's year of establishment in 1909 should be acknowledged as the year of establishment of Cherno More. Several years later, the first international friendly in Bulgarian club football history was played in 1915 between Reka Ticha and the 21st Pomeranian Regiment of Prussia, which ended in a 4–4 draw. In 1919, Reka Ticha began playing matches against different teams from the capital Sofia, which ended in a success with scores of 3-0 and 1–0 against Slavia Sofia on a home-away basis and a 4–1 win against Levski Sofia in Varna. The away match with Levski in Sofia however did not take place. The subsequent growth of Bulgarian football required knowledge of the rules, and as such, in 1919, the football department of SC Reka Ticha published the first Bulgarian football rulebook titled "Football - Rules and Admonitions". It was written by the sports functionary and Reka Ticha's member Stefan Tonchev.

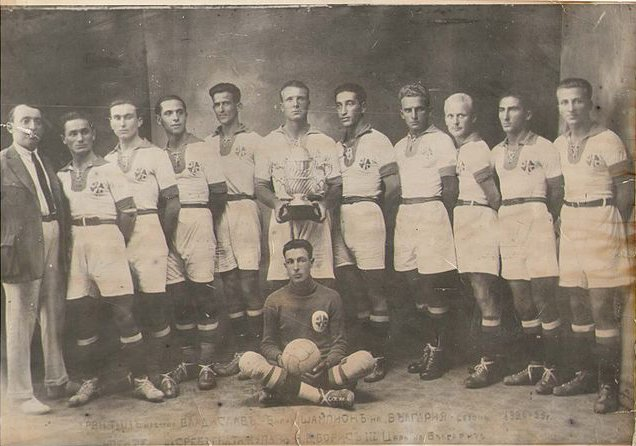
Vladislav Varna in 1925. Vladislav was one of the predecessors of Cherno More.

On January 21, 1919, SC Reka Ticha shortened its name to Sports Club Ticha, and the kit colours were chosen to be red and white. In the same year, the Bulgarian musician Nikola Nitsov wrote the official anthem of the club.

In 1921 Sports Club Granit left the collective membership with SK Ticha due to financial disputes, becoming SC Vladislav after Polish king Władysław of Varna. Their emblem was the four-leaf clover and the kit colours were green and white which are still today the official colours of successor Cherno More. SC Vladislav was to become the first team to win the Tsar's Cup in 1925 rendering them the first champions of the Kingdom of Bulgaria. The captain, Egon Terzetta is revered by the Cherno More fans as the scorer in the final match, winning the cup for the green-white team. Later, in 1945 they will rejoin SK Ticha in a merger and the club will be known as Ticha-Vladislav.

In 1925 SK Ticha won the București Cup, after two straight wins against Tricolor (to become later Unirea Tricolor) and Sportul Studentesc both from Bucharest. This turned to be the first international football trophy won by a Bulgarian football club, making SK Ticha the most popular club in Varna at the time.

In 1935 and 1936 SK Ticha finished as runners-up in the knockout National competition. In 1938 the club became Bulgarian champions winning the first edition of the United National Football league. The members of the Championship winning team were: Ivan Saraydarov, Onik Haripyan, Garabed Garabedov, Ivan Gochev, Atanas Kovachev, Georgi Radev, Vili Petkov, Panayot Rozov, Milyu Parushev, Iliya Donchev and Dobri Baychev.

In total, 18 SK Ticha and SC Vladislav players were selected for the national team. Boyan Byanov of SK Ticha captained the National team in its first ever match against Austria in Vienna, played on 21 May 1924. The same year he also participated in the Olympic National team for the Paris games.

=== Communist era (1944-1989) ===
With the establishment of Communist rule in Bulgaria after WWII, significant changes took place affecting all leading clubs without exception. It was a time for mergers, splits, changing of names and in some cases closure of clubs. All this, to suit the new vision of the new communist ruled government. On 18 February 1945, SC Ticha and SC Vladislav merged with all their available assets and the new name of the club was Ticha-Vladislav. An important issue about the merger of these two teams, and the claims by Cherno More supporters who descend from them, is that it was not as a result of bankruptcy, insolvency, bad debts or any other foul play, but the result of a decision by a political party which had absolute and unchecked power, which simply decided that there were just too many clubs in the city of Varna and that their number should be reduced.

On 11 May 1947 SC Primoretz also joined the club, now to be known as TVP. SC Primoretz practised basketball, tennis, athletics and swimming and did not have a football team. Chairman of the club was the long time SC Vladislav sportsman Aleksi Aleksiev who now became the chairman of TVP.

In 1948–49, under the name Botev, the club took part in the highest level of the first post-war league to be known as Bulgarian A Football Group or "A" RFG. Botev Varna finished 6th in a group of 10 teams with centre forward Nedko Nedev ending up as a joint top scorer of the competition with 11 goals, as many as Dimitar Milanov had scored for CDNV Sofia. Some more reorganisation, in accordance with the Soviet principles, took place in the next season. The town of Varna was renamed Stalin in honour of the Soviet dictator and stayed that way until 1956. A departmental system was applied, placing most clubs under the umbrella of two major departments, The Ministry of Defence and The Ministry of Interior. Botev Stalin went under military command and was ordered to play in the Third division (group "V") to make place for the newly formed People's Army team (ONV, later CSKA) from Sofia which started in "A" RFG straight after being founded. Although relegated by decree, the team of Botev Stalin retained most of its players and under the leadership of trainer Ivan Mokanov was promoted back to "A" RFG in 2 successive seasons, under the name VMS (which stands for Bulgarian Navy).

In 1953, VMS Stalin finished 3rd in the competition after the two leading Sofia clubs. The saddest season in the club's history is 1955. It started with 5 consecutive wins, all against Sofia teams. The hopes of title-dreaming supporters were dashed with only 1 point in the following 10 games. The team was relegated at the end of the season to be promoted back the next year under its previous name, Botev Varna.

In 1959, a small team from "B" RFG by the name of Cherno More, which resulted from the merger of two other Varna teams (Lokomotiv and Korabostroitel) one year earlier, joined Botev and from this year until now, the club is known by the name Cherno More. The club stayed in "A" RFG without interruption until 1976 but did not have any major achievements. Under the control of the Ministry of Defence over the years, a number of talented players left the club for the Central Army Club (CSKA) without Cherno More receiving adequate compensation. One of them, Bozhil Kolev, starred in the defence of the National team in the World Cup finals in BRD'74.

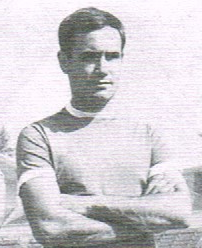
Stefan Bogomilov is Cherno More's leading goalscorer in the club's history.

Cherno More had its moments of glory in a friendly against Ajax which ended in a 3–1 win on 8 June 1966, with goals from Zdravko Mitev (2) and Stefan Bogomilov. The 19 year old Johan Cruyff scored for Ajax. In August 1966 the team from Varna visited England and played three matches. The most memorable was the 1–0 win against Nottingham Forest on City Ground. Nottingham fielded a strong side with Peter Grummitt, Bob McKinlay, Alan Hinton, Henry Newton, Joe Baker, Terry Hennessey, Jeff Whitefoot in the starting 11. The match was decided with a long range shot from defender Dimitar Bosnov in the first half. Nottingham Forest was to end the 1966-67 season as runners-up in the Football League First Division. The other two matches ended in a 1–1 draw against Coventry City after Stefan Yanev had opened the score, and a 1–2 defeat to Sheffield Wednesday F.C. After 16 years in the top flight, Cherno More was relegated in 1976 and won promotion the following season. A new generation of players was emerging. Defenders Todor Marev and Ivan Ivanov, midfielders Todor Atanasov and Ivan Andreev, forwards Rafi Rafiev and Nikola Spasov left many good memories in the late 70s and the 80s. In the 1981–82 season, the team finished 4th and therefore qualified for the Intertoto Cup. Cherno More won twice 2–0 at home against Standard Liège and the Danes from Hvidovre IF and drew 1–1 against Bayer 04 Leverkusen. Away, they drew 1–1 in Denmark and lost 1-3 and 0–3 in Liège and Leverkusen respectively. Later in the 80s, Cherno More was relegated twice and played 3 seasons in "B" RFG. The team reached the final of The Soviet Army Cup and were runners-up twice in 1985 and 1988.

=== The 90s struggle ===
The fall of socialism in Bulgaria in 1989 and the establishment of democracy brought new hardships for Bulgarian football clubs. The transition from state backed organisations to privately owned entities saw many traditional football clubs disappear entirely, while others were forced to declare bankruptcy, only to return later by obtaining licences from smaller clubs. Cherno More avoided any administrative changes and kept its name and history, but spent six consecutive seasons in the league's second tier. Relegated in season 1989-90 and again in 1993-94 and facing immense financial difficulties, at one time during the 1998–99 season, the club came close to relegation to the 3rd division of Bulgarian football. Despite being in the "B"RFG, Cherno More sold their best player and own product Ilian Iliev to Levski Sofia for a then Bulgarian record of 2 million leva (£60 000) in 1991. Things started to get better in 1998 with new chairman Krasen Kralev who turned the club into a joint-stock company.

=== New millennium ===
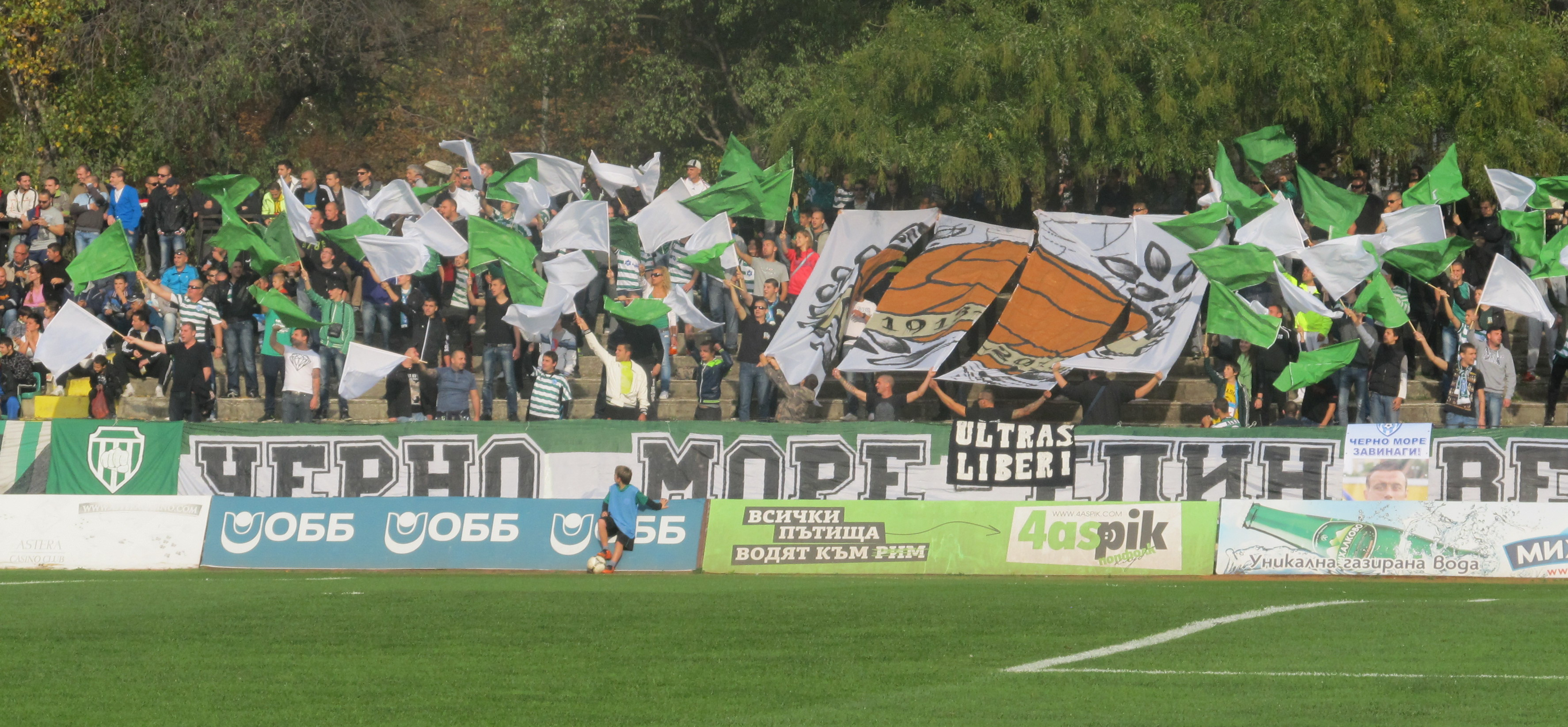
Cherno More ultras on the stadium's eastern stand.

The new millennium saw the club establishing itself in the country's top flight. The Sailors spent the majority of the 90s in Bulgaria's second tier before securing promotion at the end of the 1999–2000 season, ending a six consecutive season spell in the B Group. Cherno More survived minor relegation scares in their first two seasons back in the A Group and then went on to become a regular feature in the league's top half. In 2002, Kralev convinced businessman Ilia Pavlov to buy the club. Pavlov had ideas about developing the club and turning it into one of the leaders in Bulgarian football. He appointed the young and ambitious coach Velislav Vutsov and signed many experienced players such as National team goalkeeper Zdravko Zdravkov, defenders Adalbert Zafirov and Georgi Ginchev. Some foreign players such as Lúcio Wagner, Darko Spalević and Maltese international Daniel Bogdanović also made their way to Varna. The results were quick to follow. Victories against champions CSKA in Sofia and Litex in Lovech saw the team soaring up in the table. The success story came to an abrupt end with the murder of Ilia Pavlov on 7 March 2003. Months of uncertainties followed and at some point, the very existence of the club was at stake until Bulgarian holding company Chimimport acquired the club in 2004.

In the 2007–08 season, the Sailors finished 5th in A Group and qualified for the last season of the UEFA Cup due to licence problems of CSKA Sofia. Led by captain Alex they had a very successful run - they defeated UE Sant Julia of Andora in the first qualifying round (9–0 on aggregate) and Maccabi Netanya from Israel in the second qualifying round (3–1 on aggregate). Cherno More than challenged German side VfB Stuttgart in the 1st round and were eliminated after a 1–2 loss at home and a surprising 2–2 draw in Stuttgart after having a 2–0 lead up until the 85th minute of the game. During the same season the team was successful finishing 3rd in A Group, and qualified for the newly created European football competition, the Europa League.

In the 2009–10 season, Cherno More started their UEFA Europa League campaign by defeating Iskra-Stal from Moldova in the second qualifying round (4–0 on aggregate). Subsequently, they were drawn to play against Dutch powerhouse PSV Eindhoven in the third qualifying round. The team from Varna was eliminated after a 0-1 loss at Eindhoven and another 0-1 loss at the Lazur Stadium in Burgas.

After finishing third in 2008–09, the club failed to impress in the domestic league in the follow-up years, but saw a successful run in the Bulgarian Cup during the 2014–15 season. The Sailors defeated Sozopol, Slavia Sofia, Lokomotiv Gorna Oryahovitsa, and Lokomotiv Plovdiv on the road to the final against Levski Sofia at the Lazur Stadium in Burgas. Despite being down to ten men since the 39th minute and trailing 0–1, the team managed to equalize in added time through Bacari's volley and went on to win the Cup after Mathias Coureur's stunning strike in the 118th minute, winning the club's first post-World War II trophy.

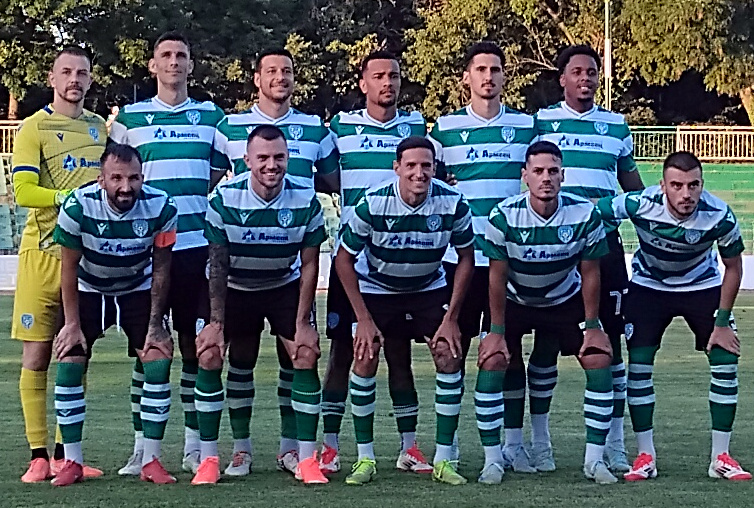
12 July 2025

In 2018, Ilian Iliev returned to the club as head coach for the first time since his departure in 2006. Under Iliev, the team managed to stabilize its performances and frequently finished in the top six of the league in the upcoming years. In 2024, Cherno More finished second in the league, the team’s highest league position in the history of the Bulgarian league since its founding in 1948. The Sailors drew Hapoel Be'er Sheva in the second qualifying round of UEFA Conference League. The following season the Sailors again qualified for UEFA Conference League by finishing third in the league. This marked the first time Cherno More finished in the top 3 of the league in successive seasons. In the Conference League in the second round they drew İstanbul Başakşehir. In the first leg Cherno More lost 0–1 in Razgrad, but in the second leg they lost 4–0 in Istanbul, losing 5–0 on aggregate.

== Honours ==
=== Domestic ===
- First League:
  - Winners (4): 1925, 1926, 1934 (as Vladislav), 1937–38 (as Ticha)
  - Runners-up (1): 2023–24
  - Third place (3): 1953, 2008–09, 2024–25
- Bulgarian Cup:
  - Winners (1): 2014–15
- Bulgarian Supercup:
  - Winners (1): 2015

=== Chronology of the names ===
Year(s)	
1909	Sport
1909–1914	Sportist
1913	Galata
1913–1914	Reka Ticha
1914	Kamtchia
1914–1919	Reka Ticha
1919–1945	Ticha
1945–1947	Ticha-Vladislav
1948–1950	Botev pri DNA
1950–1955	VMS
1956–1957	SCNA
1957–1959	ASC Botev
1959–1969	ASC Cherno More
1969–1985	FSVD Cherno More
1985–present	Cherno More

== Recent seasons ==
=== League positions ===
Season		Pos.	Pl.	W	D	L	GS	GA	P	Cup	Notes
1999-00	B Group	1	30	23	1	6	59	27	70	Round of 16	
2000–01	A Group	10	26	7	5	14	20	49	26	Round of 16	
2001–02	A Group	11	40	12	11	17	47	51	35*	Round of 16	^{Relegation Group}
2002–03	A Group	6	26	14	6	6	42	21	48	Round of 16	
2003–04	A Group	6	30	10	8	12	45	53	38	Round of 16	
2004–05	A Group	8	30	10	5	15	30	38	35	Round of 32	
2005–06	A Group	8	28	10	7	11	29	27	37	Runner-up	
2006–07	A Group	6	30	14	5	11	37	29	47	Round of 16	
2007–08	A Group	5	30	13	9	8	40	26	48	Runner-up	
2008–09	A Group	3	30	18	6	6	48	19	60	Round of 32	
2009–10	A Group	7	30	13	9	8	40	28	48	Quarter-finals	
2010–11	A Group	6	30	15	6	9	36	28	51	Quarter-finals	
2011–12	A Group	7	30	16	4	10	46	25	52	Round of 32	
2012–13	A Group	10	30	9	8	13	33	39	35	Round of 16	
2013–14	A Group	6	38	14	12	12	40	33	54	Round of 16	^{Championship Group}
2014–15	A Group	8	32	15	5	12	42	36	50	Winner	^{Relegation Group}
2015–16	A Group	6	32	10	8	14	36	45	38	Quarter-finals	
2016–17	First League	6	36	13	8	15	39	45	47	Quarter-finals	^{Championship Group}
2017–18	First League	7	32	11	7	14	33	35	40	Round of 32	^{Relegation Group}
2018–19	First League	5	36	15	7	14	44	51	52	Quarter-finals	^{Championship Group}
2019–20	First League	7	29	12	11	6	39	27	47	Round of 16	^{Relegation Group}
2020–21	First League	7	32	12	9	11	37	34	45	Round of 16	^{Europa Conference League Group}
2021–22	First League	5	31	12	11	8	36	22	47	Round of 16	^{Championship Group}
2022–23	First League	6	35	15	9	11	39	35	54	Semi-finals	^{Championship Group}
2023–24	First League	2	35	22	9	4	56	26	75	Round of 32	^{Championship Group}
2024–25	First League	3	36	15	14	7	44	30	59	Semi-finals	^{Championship Group}
2025–26	First League	7	36	14	12	10	40	34	54	Round of 16	^{Conference League group}
2026–27	First League	13	10	1	3	6	11	20	6	Round of 32	TBD

*Points deducted from all teams after completing the first phase of campaign.
Championship/Relegation groups are constituted after all teams have played each other home and away.

== European record ==
As of match played 31 July 2025

Competition	Played	Won	Drew	Lost	GF	GA	GD	Win%
UEFA Intertoto Cup	10	4	2	4	14	10	+4	40.00
UEFA Cup	6	3	2	1	15	5	+10	50.00
UEFA Europa League	6	2	1	3	5	7	−2	33.33
UEFA Europa Conference League	4	0	1	3	1	7	−6	0.00
Total	26	9	6	11	35	29	+6	34.62

=== Matches ===
As of 31 July 2025

Season	Competition	Round	Club	Home	Away	Aggregate
1982	Intertoto Cup					
1982	Intertoto Cup	Group Stage	(Belgium) Standard Liège	2–0	1–3	3rd
1982	Intertoto Cup	Group Stage	(West Germany) Bayer Leverkusen	1–1	0–3	3rd
1982	Intertoto Cup	Group Stage	(Denmark) Hvidovre IF	2–0	1–1	3rd
2007	UEFA Intertoto Cup	2Q	(North Macedonia) Makedonija	4−0	3−0	7–0
2007	UEFA Intertoto Cup	3Q	(Italy) Sampdoria	0−1	0−1	0−2
2008–09	UEFA Cup	1Q	(Andorra) Sant Julià	4−0	5−0	9−0
2008–09	UEFA Cup	2Q	(Israel) Maccabi Netanya	2−0	1−1	3−1
2008–09	UEFA Cup	PO	(Germany) Stuttgart	1−2	2−2	3−4
2009–10	UEFA Europa League	2Q	(Moldova) Iskra-Stal	1−0	3−0	4−0
2009–10	UEFA Europa League	3Q	(Netherlands) PSV Eindhoven	0−1	0−1	0−2
2015–16	UEFA Europa League	2Q	(Belarus) Dinamo Minsk	1−1	0−4	1−5
2024–25	UEFA Conference League	2Q	(Israel) Hapoel Be'er Sheva	1−2	0−0	1−2
2025–26	UEFA Conference League	2Q	(Turkey) İstanbul Başakşehir	0−1	0−4	0−5

Notes

- 1Q: First qualifying round
- 2Q: Second qualifying round
- 3Q: Third qualifying round
- PO: Play-off round

== Stadium ==
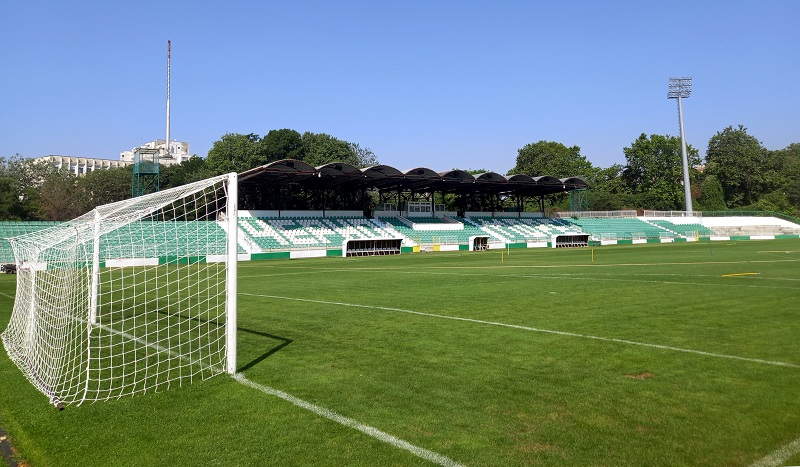
Stadion Ticha

Ticha Stadium was constructed and completed in 1935 with the help of volunteers and fans by an initiative held by the then-president of the club Vladimir Chakarov. In 1968, the stadium was renovated and stands were built. The stadium currently has a capacity of 6,250 seating places, spread in two opposite stands. The main south stand has a roof cover and holds 3,250 spectators, while the opposite north stand has a seating capacity of 3,000 spectators. The north stand is commonly used by the Cherno More ultras and the away fans. The current stadium was built entirely with the help of volunteers and sports fans of the club on the place of the old Reka Ticha playground.

In 2007, the local municipality governors and the owners of the club announced in an official statement, that the club would move to a new all-seater stadium, which would be built in the place of the previously unused and demolished Yuri Gagarin Stadium. It would also replace the current Ticha stadium, which would solve numerous problems on match day, including traffic congestion and the lack of nearby parking lots for the fans. The stadium will have a capacity of 22,000 spectators and would be part of Sport Complex Varna, which includes an underground parking area, convertible roof covers, office lounges, two-tier stands and four 50 meter towers, which would block the pressure of the terrain and bring the stadium's shape in a ship. The convertible roof covers will be made of transparent panels, which will allow the light of the floodlights to stream inside the pitch on a night match. The venue would be awarded with an Elite Stadium category ranking by UEFA.

Following several delays over the next years, majorly due to the 2008 financial crisis and the subsequent lack of funding, in 2015 the construction of the stadium finally started and is expected to be finished by late 2019, with the first match being played on the new stadium in 2020.

== Statistics and records ==
Todor Marev holds First League's and Cherno More's overall appearances record — 422 matches for 20 seasons (from 1971 to 1990 and in 1993–94 season).

Cherno More's all-time leading scorer in the top league is Stefan Bogomilov, who scored 162 goals for the club (from 1962 to 1976). He also holds the club record of 4 hattricks. The club's second highest scorer is Georgi Iliev, who scored 71 goals. Center forward Miroslav Manolov holds the club's and A Group's record for the fastest goal - 6 seconds after the referee's first signal, against FC Montana on 22 March 2012.

Cherno More's biggest victories in A Group are the 8-0 wins against Cherveno Zname Pavlikeni in 1955 and Maritsa Plovdiv in 1968. Cherno More's largest defeat, 1–8, was against Lokomotiv Plovdiv in 2004. Also, the club's win against UE Sant Julia, 5–0, in 2008, was the largest European win in the club's history.

As of 8 November 2026

Most appearances for the club in First League

Rank	Name	Years	Appearances
1	(Bulgaria) Todor Marev	1971–1990; 1993–1994	422
2	(Bulgaria) Stefan Bogomilov	1962–1976	346
3	(Bulgaria) Dimitar Bosnov	1955–1970	343
4	(Bulgaria) Georgi Iliev	2000–2003; 2008–2014; 2015–2019	318
5	(Bulgaria) Zdravko Mitev	1963–1976	267
6	(Bulgaria) Vasil Panayotov	2018–present	260
7	(Bulgaria) Todor Atanasov	1979–1990; 1992–1993	257
8	(Bulgaria) Abil Bilyalov	1960–1973	252
9	(Bulgaria) Yanko Atanasov	1958–1969	244
10	(Bulgaria) Zhivko Atanasov	2012–2015; 2021–present	244

Most goals for the club in First League

Rank	Name	Career	Goals
1	(Bulgaria) Stefan Bogomilov	1962–1976	162
2	(Bulgaria) Georgi Iliev	2000–2003; 2008–2014; 2015–2019	71
3	(Bulgaria) Rafi Rafiev	1975–1987	64
4	(Bulgaria) Nikola Dimitrov	1959–1970	63
5	(Bulgaria) Zdravko Mitev	1963–1976	61
6	(Bulgaria) Damyan Georgiev	1968–1978	55
7	(Bulgaria) Nikola Spasov	1983–1986; 1993–1994	50
8	(Bulgaria) Todor Atanasov	1979–1990; 1992–1993	49
9	(Bulgaria) Georgi Dimitrov	1951–1955; 1959–1965	46
10	(Martinique) Mathias Coureur	2014–2016; 2020; 2022	40

== Players ==
=== First-team squad ===
As of 26 August 2026

Note: Flags indicate national team as defined under FIFA eligibility rules; some limited exceptions apply. Players may hold more than one non-FIFA nationality.

No.	Pos.	Nation	Player
3	DF	BUL	Zhivko Atanasov (vice-captain)
5	DF	ARG	Luciano Squadrone
7	MF	POR	Miguel Barandas
8	MF	BUL	Asen Donchev
9	FW	ESP	Jorge Padilla
10	FW	POR	Celso Sidney
11	MF	FRA	Mohamed Achi
13	DF	BUL	Emanuil Nyagolov
14	MF	BUL	Aleksandar Todorov
17	MF	BUL	Ivan Tasev (on loan from CSKA Sofia)
18	MF	BUL	Petar Andreev
19	FW	BUL	Georgi Lazarov
20	FW	BUL	Aleksandar Kolev
22	MF	BUL	Nikolay Kostadinov

No.	Pos.	Nation	Player
23	MF	BUL	Martin Banev
24	MF	POR	David Teles
26	DF	BRA	João Bandaró
29	MF	BUL	Berk Beyhan
31	GK	BUL	Damyan Hristov
37	DF	BUL	Ventsislav Kerchev
44	DF	FRA	Nestorly Lumbu
50	DF	BUL	Ertan Tombak
70	GK	BUL	Antoan Manasiev
71	MF	BUL	Vasil Panayotov (captain)
75	MF	CYP	Giorgos Pontikou
81	GK	BUL	Kristian Tomov
93	DF	BUL	Georgi Ventsislavov
99	MF	ALG	Idris Bounaas

=== Out on loan ===
Note: Flags indicate national team as defined under FIFA eligibility rules; some limited exceptions apply. Players may hold more than one non-FIFA nationality.

No.	Pos.	Nation	Player
39	FW	BUL	Nikolay Zlatev (at Al Kharaitiyat)

For recent transfers, see Transfers winter 2025–26 and Transfers summer 2026.

=== Foreign players ===
Up to twenty foreign nationals can be registered and given a squad number for the first team in the Bulgarian First League, however only five non-EU nationals can be used during a match day. Those non-EU nationals with European ancestry can claim citizenship from the nation their ancestors came from. If a player does not have European ancestry he can claim Bulgarian citizenship after playing in Bulgaria for 5 years.

EU Nationals

- (Cyprus) Giorgos Pontikou
- (Spain) Jorge Padilla
- (Portugal) Celso Sidney
- (Portugal) David Teles

EU Nationals (Dual citizenship)

- (Algeria) (France) Idris Bounaas
- (Argentina) (Italy) Luciano Squadrone
- (France) (Morocco) Mohamed Achi
- (France) (Democratic Republic of the Congo) Nestorly Lumbu
- (Portugal) (Angola) Miguel Barandas

Non-EU Nationals

- (Brazil) João Bandaró

== Club officials ==
=== Board of directors ===
Position	Name	Nationality
Owner	Marin Mitev	(Bulgaria)
Technical director	Plamen Andreev	(Bulgaria)
Director of the youth football	Stanislav Stoyanov	(Bulgaria)
Director of Communications	Ivaylo Borisov	(Bulgaria)
Director of Recruitment	Todor Velikov	(Bulgaria)

=== Current technical body ===
Position	Name	Nationality
Manager	Ilian Iliev	(Bulgaria)
Assistant Manager	Petar Kostadinov	(Bulgaria)
Assistant Manager	Veselin Branimirov	(Bulgaria)
Goalkeeping Coach	Boyan Peykov	(Bulgaria)
Fitness coach	Aleksandar Filipov	(Bulgaria)

== Coaches history ==
Coach	Nat	From	To
Ivan Mokanov	(Bulgaria)	Jan 1949	May 1958
Stefan Stefanov	(Bulgaria)	May 1958	Oct 1958
Ivan Mokanov	(Bulgaria)	Oct 1958	June 1960
Dimitar Dimitrov	(Bulgaria)	June 1960	Aug 1960
Lozan Kotsev	(Bulgaria)	Aug 1960	Apr 1962
Iliya Apostolov	(Bulgaria)	Apr 1962	July 1962
Manol Manolov	(Bulgaria)	July 1962	Apr 1963
Iliya Apostolov (2)	(Bulgaria)	Apr 1963	July 1963
Ivan Mokanov (3)	(Bulgaria)	July 1963	Jan 1968
Georgi Dimitrov	(Bulgaria)	Jan 1968	July 1972
Spas Kirov	(Bulgaria)	July 1972	Oct 1973
Ivan Mokanov (4)	(Bulgaria)	Oct 1973	Jan 1975
Georgi Dimitrov (2)	(Bulgaria)	Jan 1975	July 1976
Kiril Rakarov	(Bulgaria)	July 1976	Dec 1976
Ivan Vasilev	(Bulgaria)	Dec 1976	July 1979
Bozhil Kolev	(Bulgaria)	July 1979	July 1980
Ivan Vasilev (2)	(Bulgaria)	July 1980	Feb 1981
Stoyan Ormandzhiev	(Bulgaria)	Feb 1981	Apr 1981
Bozhil Kolev (2)	(Bulgaria)	Apr 1981	July 1981
Spas Kirov (2)	(Bulgaria)	July 1981	22 May 1983
Todor Velikov	(Bulgaria)	23 May 1983	25 Nov 1985
Spas Kirov (3)	(Bulgaria)	2 Dec 1985	4 Oct 1986
Bozhil Kolev (3)	(Bulgaria)	5 Oct 1986	4 June 1989
Nikola Kovachev	(Bulgaria)	July 1989	Nov 1989
Abil Bilyalov	(Bulgaria)	Nov 1989	2 June 1990
Todor Velikov (2)	(Bulgaria)	3 June 1990	27 Sep 1991
Kevork Tahmisyan	(Bulgaria)	28 Sep 1991	5 Jan 1992
Bozhil Kolev (4)	(Bulgaria)	6 Jan 1992	6 Feb 1994
Stefan Bogomilov	(Bulgaria)	7 Feb 1994	22 May 1994
Iliya Iliev	(Bulgaria)	23 May 1994	31 July 1994

Coach	Nat	From	To
Vachko Marinov	(Bulgaria)	9 Aug 1994	20 Jan 1995
Damyan Georgiev	(Bulgaria)	30 Jan 1995	30 June 1995
Milen Goranov	(Bulgaria)	10 July 1995	19 Aug 1995
Petko Petkov	(Bulgaria)	20 Aug 1995	26 Nov 1995
Nikola Spasov	(Bulgaria)	27 Nov 1995	19 Dec 1995
Asen Milushev	(Bulgaria)	20 Dec 1995	10 June 1996
Damyan Georgiev (2)	(Bulgaria)	2 July 1996	2 March 1997
Tsonyo Vasilev	(Bulgaria)	4 March 1997	28 Aug 1997
Todor Marev	(Bulgaria)	29 Aug 1997	29 Sep 1997
Lyudmil Goranov	(Bulgaria)	30 Sep 1997	24 Feb 1998
Todor Marev (2)	(Bulgaria)	25 Feb 1998	30 June 1998
Stefan Bogomilov (2)	(Bulgaria)	27 July 1998	28 Oct 1998
Rudi Minkovski	(Bulgaria)	29 Oct 1998	6 Dec 1998
Svetozar Svetozarov	(Bulgaria)	16 Jan 1999	20 June 1999
Radi Zdravkov	(Bulgaria)	21 June 1999	10 June 2000
Bozhil Kolev (5)	(Bulgaria)	26 June 2000	13 Aug 2001
Aleksandar Stankov	(Bulgaria)	14 Aug 2001	24 June 2002
Velislav Vutsov	(Bulgaria)	2002	2004
Ilian Iliev	(Bulgaria)	2004	March 4, 2006
Yasen Petrov	(Bulgaria)	March 13, 2006	May 27, 2007
Nikola Spasov (2)	(Bulgaria)	May 27, 2007	Sep 15, 2009
Velizar Popov	(Bulgaria)	Sept 16, 2009	Oct 29, 2010
Stefan Genov	(Bulgaria)	Oct 30, 2010	Sept 24, 2012
Adalbert Zafirov	(Bulgaria)	Sept 25, 2012	Dec 17, 2012
Georgi Ivanov	(Bulgaria)	Dec 17, 2012	May 19, 2014
Aleksandar Stankov (2)	(Bulgaria)	May 22, 2014	Aug 18, 2014
Nikola Spasov (3)	(Bulgaria)	Aug 19, 2014	Jun 10, 2016
Georgi Ivanov (2)	(Bulgaria)	Jun 21, 2016	Sept 21, 2017
Emanuel Lukanov	(Bulgaria)	Sept 21, 2017	Dec 28, 2017
Ilian Iliev (2)	(Bulgaria)	Dec 28, 2017	present
