= OSK AS-23 =

Atletik-Slava 1923
- Full name: Officers' Sports Club Atletik-Slava 1923
- Nickname: Asisti
- Short name: AS-23
- Founded: 4 November 1923; 102 years ago
- Dissolved: 9 November 1944; 81 years ago
- Ground: Atletik Park
- Capacity: 15,000
Home colours	Away colours

Officers' Sports Club Atletik-Slava 1923 (Bulgarian: Офицерски спортен клуб „Атлетик-Слава 1923“, lit. ''Officers' Sports Club Athletic-Glory 1923''), Atletik-Slava 23, or simply AS-23, was a Bulgarian army officers' football club based in the capital of Sofia.

The club colors were black and white and its emblem was a black lion over a white shield. Home ground was what today is the Bulgarian Army Stadium. The club's motto was "Athleticism and Glory."

== History ==
AS-23 was founded on 4 November 1923 following the merger of three Sofia-based football clubs: Officers' Sports Club, Athletic, and Slava. The club's first chairman was lieutenant colonel Nikola Karagyozov.

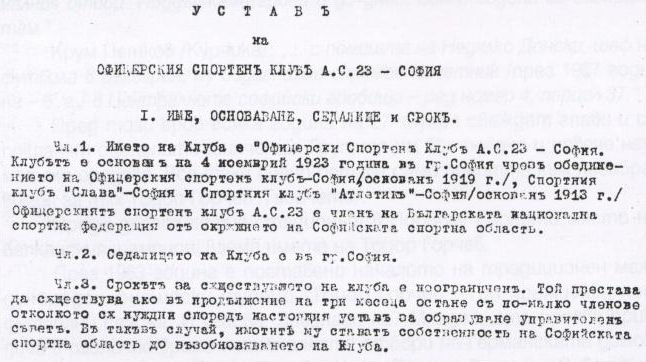
AS-23's Founding Charter (4 November 1923)

During 1930–31 season, the club won the local Sofia division. In the play-offs, AS-23 defeated Etar Veliko Tarnovo 5–0, Sila Yambol 7–0, Napredak Ruse 3–1 and won the final against Shipchenski Sokol 3–0. They managed to do a domestic double, winning the Bulgarian Cup the same year.

In the 1940–41 season, some of the club's key players were drafted into the army and AS-23 finished 5^{th} in the Sofia Elite Division. Nevertheless, they won the newly created tournament, the Tsar's Cup, by defeating Napredak Ruse 4–2 in the final.

AS-23 experienced financial difficulties during the early 1940s, but the anti-communist Brannik organization provided financial help, while the Ministry of War procured the sports kits, allowing the club to survive.

In November 1944, following the Soviet Army's occupation of Bulgaria, the club was merged with Shipka Sofia and Spartak Poduene to form Chavdar Sofia, which ultimately laid the foundations to what is known today as CSKA Sofia.

== Stadium ==
AS-23's stadium, known as Atletik Park, was at the place of the current Stadion Balgarska Armia. On 27 January 1925, the Municipality of Sofia allotted the club land for the stadium. During the 1930s, AS-23 was officially granted the deed to the facility. In 1944, the grounds were assumed by Chavdar Sofia, and then by the Ministry of Defence.

== Honours ==
- Bulgarian State Football Championship:
  - Champions (1): 1931
- Bulgarian Cup:
  - Winners (1): 1941
