= Greece national football team results (1929–1959) =

This article provides details of international football games played by the Greece national football team from their inception in 1929 to 1959.

The Greece national team was officially created in 1929, however, the first appearance of a Greece national team came 33 years earlier, at the 1896 Summer Olympics in Athens, where a Greece XI was beaten by a Denmark XI, either 0–9 or 0–15, at the Neo Phaliron Velodrome in a demonstration game. Greece also participated in the 1906 Intercalated Games in Athens, as the Athens City selection, which ended in another humiliation at the hands of the Danish, losing the final 0–9. Greece also participated in the Inter-Allied Games in Paris in 1919, and in the 1920 Summer Olympics of Antwerp (recognized as first official by FIFA).

Between their first official match in 1929 and 1959, Greece played in 70 matches, resulting in 17 victories, 10 draws and 43 defeats. Throughout this period they played in the Balkan Cup six times between 1929 and 1936 with their best result being a second-place in the 1934–35 edition. Greece also participated in three Mediterranean Cups in 1949, 1950-53 and 1953-58, with Greece never doing better than a second-place finish in the second edition.

== Results ==
Key
Win
Draw
Defeat

=== 1896 Olympic Games ===
12 April 1896 1896 Summer Olympics	Greece	0–9 or 0–15	Denmark	Piraeus, Greece
15:40		Report		Stadium: Neo Phaliron Velodrome; Attendance: 6,000; Referee: Prince George of Greece and Denmark (Greece)
Note: The International Olympic Committee does not acknowledge that football was played at the 1896 Olympics; however, there is incontrovertible evidence that this match was played as a demonstration sport.

=== 1906 Intercalated Games ===
23 April 1906 1906 Intercalated Games semi-finals	Athens City (Greece)	5–0	(Ottoman Empire) Thessaloniki	Piraeus, Greece
		Report		Stadium: Neo Phaliron Velodrome; Referee: Carl Anderson (Denmark)

24 April 1906 1906 Intercalated Games Final	Athens City (Greece)	0–9	Denmark	Piraeus, Greece
		Report		Stadium: Neo Phaliron Velodrome; Referee: Goster Drake (Sweden)
Note: The Athens team withdrew from the final at half-time, because they were losing 0–9 at home and wanted to avoid further humiliation.

=== 1919 Inter-Allied Games ===
25 June 1919 Inter-Allied Games group stage	Italy	9–0	Greece	Paris, France
	Sardi; Cevenini; Santamaria; Asti	Report		Stadium: Stade Pershing

26 June 1919 Inter-Allied Games group stage	France	11–0	Greece	Paris, France
	Nicolas; Rénier; Dubly; Darjeu; Petit	Report		Stadium: Stade Pershing

28 June 1919 Inter-Allied Games group stage	Greece	3–2	Romania	Paris, France
	?	Report	?	Stadium: Stade Pershing

1919 Inter-Allied Games friendly	Greece	5–1	(Kingdom of Serbia) Serbia	Paris, France
	?	Report	?	Stadium: Stade Pershing
Note: score may have been 2–0 forfeit

=== 1920 Summer Olympics ===
28 August 1920 1920 Summer Olympics first round	Sweden	9–0	Greece	Antwerp, Belgium
17:30	Olsson 4', 79'; Karlsson 15', 20', 21', 51', 85'; Wicksell 25'; Dahl 31'	Report		Stadium: Olympic Stadium; Attendance: 5,000; Referee: Charles Barette (Belgium)
Note: Recognised by FIFA as Greece's first international game. Not recognised by the Hellenic Football Federation.

=== 1929 ===
7 April 1929 Friendly	Greece	1–4	Italy B	Athens, Greece
15:30	Nahmias 60'	Report	Volk 35', 65'; Busini 68'; Tansini 80'	Stadium: Leoforos Alexandras Stadium; Attendance: 15,000; Referee: Ferenc Kann (Hungary)
Note: Recognised by the Hellenic Football Federation as Greece's first official match.

30 June 1929 Friendly	Bulgaria	1–1	Greece	Sofia, Bulgaria
18:00	Staykov 63' (pen.)	Report	G. Andrianopoulos 15'	Stadium: Levski Field; Attendance: 12,000; Referee: Ernest Fabris (Yugoslavia)

=== 1930 ===
26 January 1930 1929–31 Balkan Cup	Greece	2–1	Yugoslavia	Athens, Greece
15:30 (UTC+2:00)	G. Andrianopoulos 55'; D. Andrianopoulos 59'	Report	Vujadinović 18'	Stadium: Leoforos Alexandras Stadium; Attendance: 10,000; Referee: Nikola Dosev (Bulgaria)

2 March 1930 Friendly	Italy B	3–0	Greece	Naples, Italy
	Ludueña ?', ?'; Vojak ?'	Report		Stadium: Campo Vomero; Attendance: 8,000; Referee: Adolf Miesz

25 May 1930 1929–31 Balkan Cup	Romania	8–1	Greece	Bucharest, Romania
14:00	Wetzer 8', 34', 75', 76', 80'; Vogl 43'; Raffinsky 57' (pen.); Dobay 77'	Report	V. Andrianopoulos 15'	Stadium: Stadionul Oficiul Naţional de Educaţie Fizică; Attendance: 15,000; Referee: Jovan Ružić (Yugoslavia)

7 December 1930 1929–31 Balkan Cup	Greece	6–1	Bulgaria	Athens, Greece
15:00 (+2:00)	Tsolinas 4', 50', 51', 60'; Messaris 10', 15'	Report	Peshev 56'	Stadium: Leoforos Alexandras Stadium; Attendance: 15,000; Referee: Jovan Ružić (Yugoslavia)

=== 1931 ===
15 March 1931 1929–31 Balkan Cup	Yugoslavia	4–1	Greece	Belgrade, Yugoslavia
15:00	Hitrec 35'; Tomašević 38', 75', 83'	Report	Migiakis 52'	Stadium: Stadion Beogradski S.K. Attendance: 8,000; Referee: Costel Rădulescu (Romania)

25 October 1931 1929–31 Balkan Cup	Bulgaria	2–1	Greece	Sofia, Bulgaria
15:30	Peshev 20'; Angelov 83'	Report	Kitsos 10'	Stadium: Yunak Stadium; Attendance: 10,000; Referee: Jovan Ružić (Yugoslavia)

29 November 1931 1929–31 Balkan Cup	Greece	2–4	Romania	Athens, Greece
15:00	Angelakis 34', 39'	Report	Bodola 13', 18', 84'; Sepi 51'	Stadium: Leoforos Alexandras Stadium; Attendance: 12,000; Referee: Ernest Fabris (Yugoslavia)

13 December 1931 Friendly	Greece	2–4	Hungary Amateurs	Athens, Greece
15:00	Mallios 14' (pen.); V. Andrianopoulos 71'	Report	Kovács 24'; Lutz 40' (pen.); Jiakombe 52'; Tczech 64'	Stadium: Leoforos Alexandras Stadium; Attendance: 4,413; Referee: Stavros Chatzopoulos (Greece)

=== 1932 ===
27 March 1932 Friendly	Greece	1–2	Bulgaria	Athens, Greece
15:30	Simeonidis 33'	Report	Panchev 50'; Angelov 71'	Stadium: Leoforos Alexandras Stadium; Attendance: 15,000; Referee: Ernest Fabris (Yugoslavia)

26 June 1932 1932 Balkan Cup	Yugoslavia	7–1	Greece	Belgrade, Yugoslavia
17:30	Tirnanić 5'; Glišović 15'; Zečević 51', 84'; Živković 51' (pen.), 62' (pen.); Vujadinović 80'	Report	Kitsos 4'	Stadium: Beogradski SK Stadium; Attendance: 10,000; Referee: Denis Xifando (Romania)

28 June 1932 1932 Balkan Cup	Greece	0–3	Romania	Belgrade, Yugoslavia
17:30		Report	Ciolac 6'; Schwartz 9'; Bodola 16'	Stadium: Beogradski SK Stadium; Attendance: 2,500; Referee: Stefan Chumpalov (Bulgaria)

2 July 1932 1932 Balkan Cup	Bulgaria	2–0	Greece	Belgrade, Yugoslavia
17:30	Angelov 71'; Peshev 85' (pen.)	Report		Stadium: Beogradski SK Stadium; Attendance: 3,500; Referee: Radu Istrate (Romania)

=== 1933 ===
3 June 1933 1933 Balkan Cup	Greece	3–5	Yugoslavia	Bucharest, Romania
17:00	Simeonidis 4'; Rangos 60'; Pierrakos 89'	Report	Kodrnja 12', 20', 72'; Živković 42', 79'	Stadium: Stadionul ONEF; Attendance: 6,000; Referee: Denis Xifando (Romania)

8 June 1933 1933 Balkan Cup	Romania	1–0	Greece	Bucharest, Romania
18:00	Dobay 24'	Report		Stadium: Stadionul ONEF; Attendance: 15,000; Referee: Ernest Fabris (Yugoslavia)

10 June 1933 1933 Balkan Cup	Bulgaria	2–0	Greece	Bucharest, Romania
	Todorov 85', 88'	Report		Stadium: Stadionul ONEF; Attendance: 8,000; Referee: Constantin Rădulescu (Romania)

=== 1934 ===
4 February 1934 Friendly	Greece	1–0	Bulgaria	Athens, Greece
15:00	Danelian 30'	Report		Stadium: Leoforos Alexandras Stadium; Attendance: 10,000; Referee: Stavros Chatzopoulos (Greece)

25 March 1934 1934 FIFA World Cup qualifying	Italy	4–0	Greece	Milan, Italy
15:00	Guarisi 40'; Meazza 44', 71'; Ferrari 69'	Report		Stadium: San Siro; Attendance: 20,000; Referee: René Mercet (Switzerland)

23 December 1934 1934–35 Balkan Cup	Greece	2–1	Yugoslavia	Athens, Greece
15:00	Vazos 39'; L. Andrianopoulos 67'	Report	Sekulić 12'	Stadium: Leoforos Alexandras Stadium; Attendance: 18,000; Referee: Constantin Rădulescu (Romania)

27 December 1934 1934–35 Balkan Cup	Greece	2–2	Romania	Athens, Greece
15:00	L. Andrianopoulos 14'; Choumis 75'	Report	Dobay 5'; Ciolac 13'	Stadium: Leoforos Alexandras Stadium; Attendance: 15,000; Referee: Nikola Dosev (Bulgaria)

=== 1935 ===
1 January 1935 1934–35 Balkan Cup	Greece	1–2	Bulgaria	Athens, Greece
13:30	Vazos 51'	Report	Lozanov 44'; Panchev 84'	Stadium: Leoforos Alexandras Stadium; Attendance: 20,000; Referee: Bora Vasiljević (Yugoslavia)

16 June 1935 1935 Balkan Cup	Bulgaria	5–2	Greece	Sofia, Bulgaria
17:30	Peshev 23'; Angelov 26', 28', 63'; Lozanov 68'	Report	Choumis 21', 74'	Stadium: Yunak Stadium; Attendance: 12,000; Referee: Constantin Rădulescu (Romania)

21 June 1935 1935 Balkan Cup	Greece	1–6	Yugoslavia	Sofia, Bulgaria
17:30	Baltasis 49'	Report	Živković 31', 70'; Marjanović 33'; Vujadinović 49'; Glišović 81', 83'	Stadium: Yunak Stadium; Attendance: 5,000; Referee: Nikola Dosev (Bulgaria)

24 June 1935 1935 Balkan Cup	Greece	2–2	Romania	Sofia, Bulgaria
16:00	Choumis 10', 15'	Report	Bodola 26'; Gruin 26'	Stadium: Levski Field; Attendance: 1,000; Referee: Nikola Dosev (Bulgaria)

=== 1936 ===
17 May 1936 1936 Balkan Cup	Romania	5–2	Greece	Bucharest, Romania
17:30	Bodola 21', 85'; Schwartz 37', 75'; Dobay 77'	Report	Vazos 31'; Simeonidis 76'	Stadium: Stadionul Republicii; Attendance: 15,000; Referee: Peco Bauwens (Germany)

21 May 1936 1936 Balkan Cup	Bulgaria	5–4	Greece	Bucharest, Romania
17:30	Panchev 25', 76'; Rafailov 31'; Angelov 31'; Lozanov 73'	Report	Migiakis 12'; Vikelidis 69'; Choumis 84', 86'	Stadium: Stadionul Republicii; Attendance: 20,000; Referee: Peco Bauwens (Germany)

19 June 1936 Friendly	Egypt	3–1	Greece	Cairo, Egypt
	Ambdin 22', 88'; Sakr 81'		Choumis 48' (pen.)	Stadium: Prince Farouk Stadium

=== 1938 ===
22 January 1938 1938 FIFA World Cup qualification	Mandatory Palestine	1–3	Greece	Tel Aviv, Mandatory Palestine
15:00	Neufeld 36'	Report	Vikelidis 15', 30'; Migiakis 73'	Stadium: Maccabiah Stadium; Attendance: 8,000; Referee: Mohammed Youssef (Egypt)

20 February 1938 1938 FIFA World Cup qualification	Greece	1–0	Mandatory Palestine	Athens, Greece
15:30	Vikelidis 88'	Report		Stadium: Leoforos Alexandras Stadium; Attendance: 12,000; Referee: Mika Popovic (Yugoslavia)

25 March 1938 1938 FIFA World Cup qualification	Hungary	11–1	Greece	Budapest, Hungary
15:00	Zsengellér 14', 23' (pen.), 24', 65', 81', 83'; Titkos 17', 65'; Vincze 26'; Nemes 36', 40', 51'	Report	Makris 89'	Stadium: Hungária körúti stadion Attendance: 12,000; Referee: Denis Xifando (Romania)

=== 1948 ===
23 April 1948 Friendly	Greece	1–3	Turkey	Athens, Greece
16:30	Vikelidis 70'	Report	Kırcan 9'; Küçükandonyadis 30'; Gülesin 74'	Stadium: Leoforos Alexandras Stadium; Attendance: 15,000; Referee: Generoso Dattilo (Italy)

28 November 1948 Friendly	Turkey	2–1	Greece	Istanbul, Turkey
14:30	Eken 3', 19'	Report	Fylaktos 44'	Stadium: Dolmabahçe Stadium; Attendance: 9,000; Referee: Generoso Dattilo (Italy)

=== 1949 ===
15 May 1949 Eastern Mediterranean Friendship Cup 1949	Greece	1–2	Turkey	Athens, Greece
16:45	Markopoulos 49'	Report	Kılıç 33'; Esel 44'	Stadium: Leoforos Alexandras Stadium; Attendance: 15,000; Referee: Mohammed Al Sayed (Egypt)

18 May 1949 Eastern Mediterranean Friendship Cup 1949	Greece	1–3	Egypt	Athens, Greece
16:45	Chatzistavridis 22'	Report	El-Sabbagh 3', 85'; Hamdain 5'	Stadium: Leoforos Alexandras Stadium; Attendance: 15,000; Referee: Agostino Gamba (Italy)

25 May 1949 Eastern Mediterranean Friendship Cup 1949	Greece	2–3	Italy	Athens, Greece
16:45	Stafylidis 54'; Markopoulos 76'	Report	Baldini 48'; Galassi 25', 68'	Stadium: Leoforos Alexandras Stadium; Attendance: 15,000; Referee: Mohammed Al Sayed (Egypt)

25 November 1949 Friendly	Greece	8–0	Syria	Athens, Greece
15:15	Papantoniou 15', 17', 60'; Vasileiadis 25', 73'; Maropoulos 27'; Nembidis 79', 89'	Report		Stadium: Leoforos Alexandras Stadium; Attendance: 15,000; Referee: Giannis Tsitsis (Greece)

=== 1950 ===
17 February 1950 1950–53 Eastern Mediterranean Cup	Egypt	2–0	Greece	Cairo, Egypt
15:30	El-Attiyah 36', 87'	Report		Stadium: Prince Farouk Stadium; Attendance: 12,000; Referee: Generoso Dattilo (Italy)

13 December 1950 Friendly	Greece	0–1	France	Athens, Greece
15:00		Report		Stadium: Leoforos Alexandras Stadium; Attendance: 18,000; Referee: Giovanni Galeati (Italy)

=== 1951 ===
8 April 1951 1950–53 Eastern Mediterranean Cup	Italy	3–0	Greece	Palermo, Italy
15:30	Armano ??'; Ghiandi ??'; Galli ??'	Report		Stadium: Stadio La Favorita; Attendance: 8,000; Referee: Ismail Kassib (Egypt)

14 October 1951 Mediterranean Games 1951	Syria	0–4	Greece	Alexandria, Egypt
		Report	Lekatsas 18', 23', 71'; Mouratis 75' (pen.)	Stadium: Muhammad Ali Stadium; Attendance: 10,000; Referee: Mohammed Al-Sayed (Egypt)

14 October 1951 Friendly	France	1–0	Greece	Marseille, France
15:00	Saunier 20'	Report		Stadium: Stade Vélodrome

18 October 1951 Mediterranean Games 1951	Egypt	0–2	Greece	Alexandria, Egypt
		Report	Kotridis 10'; Lekatsas 53'	Stadium: Muhammad Ali Stadium; Attendance: 20,000; Referee: Al-Fauzi (Syria)

25 November 1951 1950–53 Eastern Mediterranean Cup	Greece	1–0	Egypt	Athens, Greece
15:00	Darivas ??'	Report		Stadium: Leoforos Alexandras Stadium; Attendance: 16,000; Referee: Sulhi Garan (Turkey)

=== 1952 ===
29 February 1952 1950–53 Eastern Mediterranean Cup	Greece	3–1	Turkey	Athens, Greece
15:30	Darivas 15', 44', 80'	Report	Sargın 38'	Stadium: Leoforos Alexandras Stadium; Attendance: 20,000; Referee: Ferruccio Bellè (Italy)

16 May 1952 1950–53 Eastern Mediterranean Cup	Turkey	0–1	Greece	Istanbul, Turkey
		Report	Papageorgiou 9'	Stadium: Mithatpaşa Stadium; Attendance: 20,000; Referee: Guido Agnolin (Italy)

15 July 1952 1952 Summer Olympics	Denmark	2–1	Greece	Tampere, Finland
19:00	P.E. Petersen 36', 37'	Report	Emmanouilidis 85'	Stadium: Ratina Stadium; Attendance: 4,372; Referee: Waldemar Karni (Finland)

25 July 1952 Unofficial friendly	Great Britain	2–4	Greece	Hämeenlinna, Finland
	Grierson 42'; Slater 58'	Report	Emmanouilidis 29'; Papageorgiou 21', 78', 83'	Stadium: Kaurialan kenttä Attendance: 4,000; Referee: Yrjö Kaivola (Finland)
Note: Recognised by the Hellenic Football Federation. Not recognised by FIFA.

=== 1953 ===
26 April 1953 1950–53 Eastern Mediterranean Cup	Greece	0–0	Italy	Athens, Greece
16:30		Report		Stadium: Leoforos Alexandras Stadium; Attendance: 22,000; Referee: Ernst Dörflinger (Switzerland)

9 May 1953 1954 FIFA World Cup qualifier	Yugoslavia	1–0	Greece	Belgrade, Yugoslavia
15:30	Matošić 21'	Report		Stadium: JNA Stadium; Attendance: 50,000; Referee: Erich Steiner (Austria)

18 October 1953 1953–58 Mediterranean Cup	Greece	0–0	France B	Athens, Greece
16:30		Report		Stadium: Leoforos Alexandras Stadium; Attendance: 25,000; Referee: Riccardo Pieri (Italy)

1 November 1953 1954 FIFA World Cup qualifier	Greece	1–0	Israel	Athens, Greece
16:30	Bebis 53'	Report		Stadium: Leoforos Alexandras Stadium; Attendance: 22,000; Referee: Renzo Massai (Italy)

=== 1954 ===
8 March 1954 1954 FIFA World Cup qualifier	Israel	0–2	Greece	Ramat Gan, Israel
15:45		Report	Kokkinakis 61'; Kamaras 83'	Stadium: Ramat Gan Stadium; Referee: Buchmüller (Switzerland)

28 March 1954 1954 FIFA World Cup qualifier	Greece	0–1	Yugoslavia	Athens, Greece
16:15		Report	Veselinović 51'	Stadium: Leoforos Alexandras Stadium; Attendance: 25,000; Referee: Willy Rufli (Switzerland)

7 November 1954 1953–58 Mediterranean Cup	Greece	1–1	Egypt	Athens, Greece
15:15	Kouiroukidis 50'	Report	El-Dhizui 5'	Stadium: Leoforos Alexandras Stadium; Attendance: 25,000; Referee: Vasa Stefanović (Yugoslavia)

=== 1955 ===
21 January 1955 1953–58 Mediterranean Cup	Egypt	1–1	Greece	Cairo, Egypt
15:00	?'	Report	Panakis 39'	Stadium: Prince Farouk Stadium; Attendance: 25,000; Referee: Édouard Harzic (France)

13 March 1955 1953–58 Mediterranean Cup	Spain B	7–1	Greece	Madrid, Spain
16:30	Badenes 7', 35', 51', 58'; Olmedo 33', 68'; Maguregui 82'	Report	Emmanouilidis 37'	Stadium: Santiago Bernabéu Stadium; Attendance: 120,000; Referee: Maurice Frédéric Guigue (France)

17 March 1955 1953–58 Mediterranean Cup	France B	1–0	Greece	Marseille, France
	Rosidis 52' (o.g.)	Report		Stadium: Stade Vélodrome; Attendance: 15,000; Referee: Riccardo Pieri (Italy)

29 May 1955 1953–58 Mediterranean Cup	Greece	0–0	Italy B	Athens, Greece
17:30		Report		Stadium: Leoforos Alexandras Stadium; Attendance: 25,000; Referee: Borče Nedelkovski (Yugoslavia)

=== 1956 ===
22 April 1956 1953–58 Mediterranean Cup	Italy B	7–1	Greece	Naples, Italy
	Muccinelli 7', 10'; Pozzan 9'; Brugola 35', 45', 80'; Grazena 62'	Report	Panakis 49'	Stadium: Stadio Vomero; Attendance: 30,000; Referee: Louis Fauquemberghe (France)

=== 1957 ===
13 March 1957 1953–58 Mediterranean Cup	Greece	2–0	Spain B	Athens, Greece
	Yfantis 2'; Panakis 43'	Report		Stadium: Leoforos Alexandras Stadium, Athens; Attendance: 25,000; Referee: Mario Maurelli (Italy)

5 May 1957 1958 FIFA World Cup qualifier	Greece	0–0	Yugoslavia	Athens, Greece
16:30 (UTC+2:00)		Report		Stadium: Leoforos Alexandras Stadium; Attendance: 25,000; Referee: Jacques Devillers (France)

16 June 1957 1958 FIFA World Cup qualifier	Greece	1–2	Romania	Athens, Greece
17:30 (+2:00)	Panakis 29'	Report	A. Ene 15'; Ozon 78'	Stadium: Leoforos Alexandras Stadium; Attendance: 18,000; Referee: Édouard Harzic (France)

5 October 1957 Friendly	Greece	2–1	France	Athens, Greece
16:00 (UTC+2:00)	Panakis 24'; Nestoridis 90'	Report		Stadium: Leoforos Alexandras Stadium; Attendance: 20,000; Referee: Borče Nedelkovski (Yugoslavia)

3 November 1957 1958 FIFA World Cup qualifier	Romania	3–0	Greece	Bucharest, Romania
14:45 (UTC+2:00)	Petschovsky 51' (pen.); Tătaru 64'; Cacoveanu 67'	Report		Stadium: Stadionul Național; Attendance: 54,465; Referee: Pierre Schwinte (France)

10 November 1957 1958 FIFA World Cup qualifier	Yugoslavia	4–1	Greece	Belgrade, Yugoslavia
14:00 (UTC+1:00)	Mujić 6', 61'; Krstić 9'; Petaković 67'	Report	Nestoridis 28'	Stadium: JNA Stadium; Attendance: 45,000; Referee: Cesare Jonni (Italy)

=== 1958 ===
1 October 1958 1960 European Nations' Cup qualifying	France	7–1	Greece	Paris, France
20:30 (UTC+1:00)	Kopa 23'; Fontaine 25', 85'; Cisowski 29', 68'; Vincent 61', 87'	Report	Yfantis 48'	Stadium: Parc des Princes; Attendance: 37,590; Referee: Gottfried Dienst (Switzerland)

3 December 1958 1960 European Nations' Cup qualifying	Greece	1–1	France	Athens, Greece
15:00 (UTC+2:00)	Marche 85' (o.g.)	Report	Bruey 71'	Stadium: Leoforos Alexandras Stadium; Attendance: 26,000; Referee: Vincenzo Orlandini (Italy)

=== 1959 ===
15 November 1959 Football at the 1960 Summer Olympics qualification	Yugoslavia	4–0	Greece	Belgrade, Yugoslavia
14:00 (UTC+1:00)	Mujić 31', 43'; Mihajlović 45'; Kostić 78'			Stadium: JNA Stadium; Attendance: 25,000; Referee: Viktor Schicker (Switzerland)

2 December 1959 Friendly	Greece	1–3	Denmark	Athens, Greece
15:00 (UTC+2:00)	Serafidis 58'	Report	Enoksen 52', 60'; Pedersen 68'	Stadium: Leoforos Alexandras Stadium; Attendance: 9,335; Referee: Louis Fauquemberghe (France)
