= List of Yugoslavia national football team hat-tricks =

This page is a list of the hat-tricks scored for the Yugoslavia national football team and Serbia and Montenegro national football team. (Note: Following the breakup of Yugoslavia, the subsequent FR Yugoslavia national team and Serbia and Montenegro national team were recognised by FIFA as the direct successor of the original Yugoslav team) From Yugoslavia's first international match on 28 August 1920 against Czechoslovakia to their last on 21 June 2006 against Ivory Coast, there were forty four recorded hat-tricks. The first hat-trick was scored by Slavin Cindrić in 1926 against Bulgaria in a international friendly, with the final hat-trick being scored by Mateja Kežman in 2002 FIFA World Cup qualification against Faroe Islands. The most goals scored in a single game is five, achieved by Dušan Bajević against Venezuela during the Brazil Independence Cup.

The player with the most hat-tricks scored for Yugoslavia is Safet Sušić, scoring three during his international career. The teams which Yugoslavia have scored the most hat-tricks against are Austria, Bulgaria and Greece, with three each. Dušan Bajević is the only Yugoslavia player to have scored a hat-trick at the FIFA World Cup, coming against Zaire in 1974.

Yugoslavia have conceded twenty-four hat-tricks in total, with Czechoslovakia scoring five. The most hat-tricks scored by an individual against Yugoslavia is two, achieved by Jan Vaník. Pedro Cea of Uruguay scored the only World Cup hat-trick against Yugoslavia during the 1930 FIFA World Cup.

== Hat-tricks scored by Yugoslavia ==
Scores and results list Yugoslavia's/Serbia and Montenegro's goal tally first.

No.	Player	Date	Opponent	Venue	Goals	Result	Competition	Ref.
1	Slavin Cindrić	30 May 1926	Bulgaria	Maksimir Stadium, Zagreb, Yugoslavia	3 – (75', 83', 87')	3–1	Friendly	
2	Aleksandar Tomasevic	15 March 1931	Greece	BSK Stadion, Belgrade, Yugoslavia	3 – (38', 78', 87')	4–1	1929–31 Balkan Cup	
3	Slavko Kodrnja	3 June 1933	Greece	Stadionul ONEF, Bucharest, Romania	3 – (12', 20', 72')	5–3	1933 Balkan Cup	
4	Mirko Kokotović	7 June 1933	Bulgaria	Stadionul ONEF, Bucharest, Romania	3 – (9', 54', 75')	4–0	1933 Balkan Cup	
5	Blagoje Marjanović	3 June 1934	Brazil	BSK Stadion, Belgrade, Yugoslavia	3 – (50', 76', 80')	8–4	Friendly	
6	Branislav Sekulić	26 August 1934	Poland	Stadion Jugoslavija, Belgrade, Yugoslavia	3 – (24', 42', 51')	4–1	Friendly	
7	Blagoje Marjanović (2)	6 September 1936	Poland	BSK Stadion, Belgrade, Yugoslavia	4 – (3', 19', 44', 75')	9–3	Friendly	
8	Jovan Jezerkić	19 October 1947	Poland	BSK Stadion, Belgrade, Yugoslavia	4 – (10', 20', 21', 28')	7–1	Friendly	
9	Milutin Pajević	21 August 1949	Israel	Stadion Jugoslavija, Belgrade, Yugoslavia	3 – (12', 19', 26')	6–0	1950 FIFA World Cup qualification	
10	Rajko Mitić	28 May 1950	Denmark	BSK Stadion, Belgrade, Yugoslavia	3 – (54', 56', 86')	5–1	Friendly	
11	Branko Zebec	15 July 1952	India	Töölön Pallokenttä, Helsinki, Finland	4 – (17', 23', 60', 87')	10–1	1952 Summer Olympics	
12	Rajko Mitić (2)	15 July 1952	India	Töölön Pallokenttä, Helsinki, Finland	3 – (14', 43', 67')	10–1	1952 Summer Olympics	
13	Stjepan Bobek	12 September 1952	Austria	JNA Stadium, Belgrade, Yugoslavia	3 – (14', 51', 87' pen)	4–2	Friendly	
14	Rajko Mitić (3)	21 May 1953	Wales	JNA Stadium, Belgrade, Yugoslavia	3 – (10', 14', 24')	5–2	Friendly	
15	Todor Veselinović	22 September 1954	Wales	Ninian Park, Cardiff, Wales	3 – (62' pen, 77', 89')	3–1	Friendly	
16	Bernard Vukas	26 September 1954	Saar	Ludwigsparkstadion, Saarbrücken, Saarland	3 – (5', 71', 84')	5–1	Friendly	
17	Stjepan Bobek (2)	17 October 1954	Turkey	Koševo City Stadium, Sarajevo, Yugoslavia	3 – (40', 41', 71')	5–1	Friendly	
18	Miloš Milutinović	19 October 1955	Republic of Ireland	Dalymount Park, Dublin, Republic of Ireland	3 – (10', 14', 44')	4–1	Friendly	
19	Miloš Milutinović (2)	9 September 1956	Indonesia	JNA Stadium, Belgrade, Yugoslavia	3 – (35', 38', 68')	4–2	Friendly	
20	Muhamed Mujić	28 November 1956	United States	Olympic Park Stadium, Melbourne, Australia	3 – (16', 35', 56')	9–1	1956 Summer Olympics	
21	Todor Veselinović	28 November 1956	United States	Olympic Park Stadium, Melbourne, Australia	3 – (10', 84', 90')	9–1	1956 Summer Olympics	
22	Aleksandar Petaković	11 May 1958	England	JNA Stadium, Belgrade, Yugoslavia	3 – (56', 77', 83')	5–0	Friendly	
23	Todor Veselinović (2)	14 September 1958	Austria	Praterstadion, Vienna, Austria	3 – (31', 66', 70')	4–3	Friendly	
24	Tomislav Knez	6 August 1960	Tunisia	JNA Stadium, Belgrade, Yugoslavia	3 – (2', 13', 49')	7–0	Friendly	
25	Bora Kostić	26 August 1960	United Arab Republic	Stadio Adriatico, Pescara, Italy	3	6–1	1960 Summer Olympics	
26	Milan Galić	1 September 1960	Bulgaria	Stadio Flaminio, Rome, Italy	3	3–3	1960 Summer Olympics	
27	Slaven Zambata	20 October 1964	Japan	Nagai Stadium, Osaka, Japan	4	6–1	1964 Summer Olympics	
28	Slaven Zambata	25 September 1968	Finland	JNA Stadium, Belgrade, Yugoslavia	3 – (9', 73', 87')	9–1	1970 FIFA World Cup qualification	
29	Vahidin Musemić	25 September 1968	Finland	JNA Stadium, Belgrade, Yugoslavia	3 – (39', 57', 89')	9–1	1970 FIFA World Cup qualification	
30	Dušan Bajević	14 June 1972	Venezuela	Estádio Belford Duarte, Curitiba, Brazil	5 – (5', 6', 53', 68', 74')	10–0	Brazil Independence Cup	
31	Dušan Bajević (2)	18 June 1974	Zaire	Parkstadion, Gelsenkirchen, West Germany	3 – (8', 30', 81')	9–0	1974 FIFA World Cup	
32	Safet Sušić	13 November 1977	Romania	Stadionul Steaua, Bucharest, Romania	3 – (14', 51', 62')	6–4	1978 FIFA World Cup qualification	
33	Vahid Halilhodžić	15 November 1978	Greece	City Park, Skopje, Yugoslavia	3 – (33', 58', 84' pen)	4–1	1977–80 Balkan Cup	
34	Safet Sušić (2)	13 June 1979	Italy	Maksimir Stadium, Zagreb, Yugoslavia	3 – (28', 36', 66')	4–1	Friendly	
35	Safet Sušić (3)	16 September 1979	Argentina	JNA Stadium, Belgrade, Yugoslavia	3 – (23', 54', 70')	4–2	Friendly	
36	Zlatko Vujović	29 October 1986	Turkey	Stadion Poljud, Split, Croatia	3 – (25', 35', 84')	4–0	UEFA Euro 1988 qualifying	
37	Dejan Savićević	11 December 1988	Cyprus	Red Star Stadium, Belgrade, Yugoslavia	3 – (13', 33', 82')	4–0	1990 FIFA World Cup qualification	
38	Darko Pančev	31 October 1990	Austria	Red Star Stadium, Belgrade, Yugoslavia	3 – (32', 52', 85')	4–1	UEFA Euro 1992 qualifying	
39	Darko Pančev (2)	27 March 1991	Northern Ireland	Red Star Stadium, Belgrade, Yugoslavia	3 – (47', 60', 62')	4–1	UEFA Euro 1992 qualifying	
40	Dejan Savićević (2)	4 September 1991	Sweden	Råsunda Stadium, Solna, Sweden	3 – (33', 66', 75')	3–4	Friendly	
41	Savo Milošević	6 October 1996	Faroe Islands	Svangaskarð, Toftir, Faroe Islands	3 – (7', 36', 45')	8–1	1998 FIFA World Cup qualification	
42	Predrag Mijatović	29 October 1997	Hungary	Üllői úti stadion, Budapest, Hungary	3 – (26', 41', 51')	7–1	1998 FIFA World Cup qualification	
43	Predrag Mijatović (2)	15 November 1997	Hungary	Red Star Stadium, Belgrade, FR Yugoslavia	4 – (44', 48' pen, 71', 88')	5–0	1998 FIFA World Cup qualification	
44	Mateja Kežman	6 June 2001	Faroe Islands	Tórsvøllur, Tórshavn, Faroe Islands	3 – (24', 82', 89')	6–0	2002 FIFA World Cup qualification	

== Hat-tricks conceded by Yugoslavia ==
Scores and results list Yugoslavia's/Serbia and Montenegro's goal tally first.

No.	Player	Date	Opponent	Venue	Goals	Result	Competition	Ref.
1	Antonín Janda	28 August 1920	Czechoslovakia	Stadion Broodstraat, Antwerp, Belgium	3 – (34', 50', 75')	0–7	1920 Summer Olympics	
2	Jan Vaník	28 August 1920	Czechoslovakia	Stadion Broodstraat, Antwerp, Belgium	3 – (20', 46', 79' pen)	0–7	1920 Summer Olympics	
3	Jan Vaník (2)	28 October 1921	Czechoslovakia	Letná Stadium, Prague, Czechoslovakia	4 – (59', 63', 78', 86')	1–6	Friendly	
4	Gustav Wieser	10 February 1924	Austria	Stadion Concordia, Zagreb, Yugoslavia	3 – (4', 69', 87')	1–4	Friendly	
5	Jan Dvořáček	28 October 1925	Czechoslovakia	Letná Stadium, Prague, Czechoslovakia	3 – (36', 40', 66')	0–7	Friendly	
6	Paul Nicolas	13 June 1926	France	Stade Yves-du-Manoir, Colombes, France	3 – (17', 37', 61')	1–4	Friendly	
7	Josef Silný	28 June 1926	Czechoslovakia	Stadion Concordia, Zagreb, Yugoslavia	4 – (17', 27', 41', 52')	2–6	Friendly	
8	Pedro Cea	27 July 1930	Uruguay	Estadio Centenario, Montevideo, Uruguay	3 – (18', 67', 72')	1–6	1930 FIFA World Cup	
9	Mieczysław Balcer	25 October 1931	Poland	Edmund Szyc Stadium, Poznań, Poland	3 – (4', 12', 51')	3–6	Friendly	
10	Lyubomir Angelov	24 June 1935	Bulgaria	Yunak Stadium, Sofia, Bulgaria	3 – (25', 28', 66')	3–3	1935 Balkan Cup	
11	Iuliu Bodola	10 May 1936	Romania	Stadionul ONEF, Bucharest, Romania	3 – (21', 46', 51')	2–3	1936 King Alexander's Cup	
12	Helmut Schön	15 October 1939	Germany	Stadion Concordia, Zagreb, Yugoslavia	3 – (8', 68', 73')	1–5	Friendly	
13	Karl Decker	13 November 1949	Austria	BSK Stadion, Belgrade, Yugoslavia	3 – (29', 70', 73')	2–5	Friendly	
14	Károly Sándor	5 October 1958	Hungary	Maksimir Stadium, Zagreb, Yugoslavia	3 – (15', 70', 79')	4–4	Friendly	
15	Flórián Albert	11 October 1959	Hungary	JNA Stadium, Belgrade, Yugoslavia	3 – (4', 34', 69')	2–4	Friendly	
16	Heinz Strehl	30 September 1962	West Germany	Maksimir Stadium, Zagreb, Yugoslavia	3 – (19', 24', 61')	2–3	Friendly	
17	Eusébio	23 September 1964	Europe XI	JNA Stadium, Belgrade, Yugoslavia	4 – (23' pen, 43', 52', 55')	2–7	Friendly	
18	Tibor Csernai	15 October 1964	Hungary	Komazawa Olympic Park Stadium, Tokyo, Japan	4	5–6	1964 Summer Olympics	
19	Dieter Müller	17 June 1976	West Germany	Red Star Stadium, Belgrade, Yugoslavia	3 – (82', 115', 119')	2–4	UEFA Euro 1976	
20	Anghel Iordănescu	27 August 1980	Romania	Stadionul 23 August, Bucharest, Romania	3 – (21', 55' pen, 84' pen)	1–4	1977–80 Balkan Cup	
21	Michel Platini	19 June 1984	France	Stade Geoffroy-Guichard, Saint-Étienne, France	3 – (59', 61', 76')	2–3	UEFA Euro 1984	
22	Zico	30 April 1986	Brazil	Estádio do Arruda, Recife, Brazil	3 – (29', 59' pen, 76')	2–4	Friendly	
23	Hernán Crespo	24 February 1998	Argentina	Estadio José María Minella, Mar del Plata, Argentina	3 – (45' pen, 85', 89')	1–3	Friendly	
24	Patrick Kluivert	25 June 2000	Netherlands	Stadion Feijenoord, Rotterdam, Netherlands	3 – (24', 38', 54')	1–6	UEFA Euro 2000	
