= Kostas Choumis =

Greek-Romanian footballer

Personal information
- Full name: Konstantinos Choumis
- Date of birth: 20 November 1913
- Place of birth: Piraeus, Kingdom of Greece
- Date of death: 20 July 1981 (aged 67)
- Place of death: Athens, Greece
- Position: Striker

Youth career
- 1929–1933: Ethnikos Piraeus

Senior career*
Years	Team	Apps	(Gls)
1933–1936	Ethnikos Piraeus (Note: The statistics for the 1933–34 season are unavailable.)	24	(27)
1936–1946	Venus București	74	(66)
1946	Rapid București	2	(1)
1947	IT Arad	1	(0)
1947–1948	Karres Mediaș	25	(13)
1948–1949	Venus București		
1950–1951	Progresul ICAS București		
Total		126	(107)

International career
1934–1936	Greece	9	(8)
1941–1943	Romania	2	(1)

Managerial career
- 1951–1954: Progresul ICAS
- 1955: Flacăra Moreni
- 1956–1957: Locomotiva Constanța
- 1957–1958: Progresul Sibiu
- 1958–1959: CSU București
- 1959–1961: Șantierul Naval Maritim Constanța
- 1961–1962: Farul Constanța (juniors)
- 1962–1963: IMU Medgidia
- 1963: Jiul Petroșani
- Egaleo
- Ethnikos
- 1966: PAS Giannina
- 1969: Greece amateur
- * Club domestic league appearances and goals

Kostas Choumis (Greek: Κώστας Χούμης, Romanian: Constantin "Costică" Humis, born 20 November 1913 in Piraeus, Greece – deceased 20 July 1981 in Athens) was a Greek-Romanian football player who played as a striker. He is often regarded in Greece and Romania as one of the greatest strikers from the 1930s.

== Club career ==
Choumis was born on 20 November 1913 in Piraeus, Greece and began playing junior-level football in 1929 at local club Ethnikos. In 1933 he made his senior debut for The Blue-Whites. He won the South Division championship with Ethnikos in the 1934–1935 season, scoring 15 goals in 10 matches. The National Championship was not held in the 1934–35 season, but in the next year it was played, and Choumis, became a top scorer alongside three other players, with 12 goals netted in 14 matches.

In 1936, Choumis joined Romanian club Venus București, after scoring two goals against Romania a year earlier. He played his first Divizia A match on 13 September 1936 under coach Ferenc Plattkó in a 1–1 draw against AMEF Arad. At the end of his first season, the team won the title with him contributing with 18 goals netted in the 20 games Plattkó used him. He won two more championships in the 1938–39 and 1939–40 seasons, playing under coach Béla Jánosy in 14 matches in which he scored nine goals in the first one and in eight games with five goals netted in the second. He played in the last three matches of the 1940 Cupa României final, when, after two draws in two replays of the final (in the first replay, which ended 4–4, Choumis scored two goals) Rapid București won the third replay and the trophy. He remains in history as the first scorer for a Romanian team in the European competitions, netting the first goal for Venus București in the first round of the 1937 Mitropa Cup against Ujpest from Hungary. The match was lost by Venus, 4–6, with Choumis also scoring the last goal of the Romanian team.

He stayed with Venus during World War II but left in 1946 to play for IT Arad. Choumis played only one game for ITA in half a season, before moving to Rapid București, but ITA managed to win the championship without him. In 1947, he joined Karres Mediaș, where he played a season alongside Ștefan Dobay. He made a total of 102 appearances and scored 80 goals in the Romanian top-league, Divizia A. In 1948, Choumis returned to Venus, which was playing in Divizia C, and in 1950 he joined Divizia B club Progresul ICAS București, retiring in 1951.

== International career ==
Choumis played nine games and scored eight goals for Greece, making his debut on 23 December 1934 under coach Apostolos Nikolaidis in a 2–1 home win against Yugoslavia in the 1934–35 Balkan Cup. A few days later, in the same competition, he scored his first goal in a 2–2 draw against Romania.

In the 1935 Balkan Cup, he scored two doubles, the first in a loss to Bulgaria and the second in a draw against Romania. In the following edition of the Balkan Cup, he again scored a brace in a loss to Bulgaria, bringing his total tally in the Balkan Cup up to seven goals, which means he is among the all-time top scorers in the competition's history.

In his last match for Greece, he scored the team's only goal in Cairo, but the Greek squad lost to Egypt.

In 1941, after five years of living in Romania, Choumis made his debut for Romania's national team under coach Virgil Economu in a 3–2 friendly victory against Slovakia where he scored once. His second and last international match for The Tricolours came in June 1943, playing another friendly against Slovakia which ended with a 2–2 draw.

== Managerial career ==
Choumis started his coaching career at Progresul ICAS in 1951, where he worked for several of the club's teams in the Romanian lower leagues in the cities of Focșani, Satu Mare and Bucharest. From 1955 onwards, he had tenures at multiple clubs from the lower leagues, including Flacăra Moreni, Locomotiva Constanța, Progresul Sibiu, CSU București and Șantierul Naval Maritim Constanța. Notably, he helped the latter gain promotion to Divizia B. In 1961, he went to work as a junior coach at Farul Constanța, returning after one year to coach seniors at IMU Medgidia, and in 1963 he had a stint at Jiul Petroșani. Choumis returned to Greece in the mid-1960s, coaching clubs like Egaleo, Ethnikos and PAS Giannina. In 1969, he coached for one month the national amateur team of Greece.

== Death ==
Choumis died on 20 July 1981 in Athens, Greece at age 67.

== Career statistics ==
Appearances and goals by national team and year
National team	Year	Apps	Goals
Greece	1934	2	1
Greece	1935	4	4
Greece	1936	3	3
Total		9	8
Romania	1941	1	1
Romania	1943	1	0
Total		2	1

=== International goals ===
Greece score listed first, score column indicates score after each Choumis goal.

List of international goals scored by Kostas Choumis
No.	Date	Venue	Opponent	Score	Result	Competition
Greece goals
1	27 December 1934	Leoforos Alexandras Stadium, Athens, Greece	Romania	2–2	2–2	1934–35 Balkan Cup
2	16 June 1935	Yunak Stadium, Sofia, Bulgaria	Bulgaria	1–0	2–5	1935 Balkan Cup
3	16 June 1935	Yunak Stadium, Sofia, Bulgaria	Bulgaria	2–5	2–5	1935 Balkan Cup
4	24 June 1935	Levski Stadium, Sofia, Bulgaria	Romania	1–0	2–2	1935 Balkan Cup
5	24 June 1935	Levski Stadium, Sofia, Bulgaria	Romania	2–0	2–2	1935 Balkan Cup
6	21 May 1936	ONEF Stadium, Bucharest, Romania	Bulgaria	2–3	4–5	1936 Balkan Cup
7	21 May 1936	ONEF Stadium, Bucharest, Romania	Bulgaria	2–3	4–5	1936 Balkan Cup
8	19 June 1936	Prince Farouk Stadium, Cairo, Egypt	Egypt	1–1	1–3	Friendly
Romania goals
1	12 October 1941	ANEF Stadium, Bucharest, Romania	Slovakia	1–1	3–2	Friendly

== Honours ==
=== Club ===
Ethnikos Piraeus

- Greek South Division Championship: 1934–35

Venus București

- Divizia A: 1936–37, 1938–39, 1939–40
- Cupa României runner-up: 1939–40

UTA Arad

- Divizia A: 1946–47

=== International ===
Greece

- Balkan Cup runner-up : 1934–35

=== Individual ===
- Panhellenic Championship: 1935–36 (12 goals)
