= Bodola =

Bodola may refer to

- Budila, a commune in Romania
- György Bodola (died 2007), Hungarian illustrator
- Iuliu Bodola (1912–1992), Romanian association football striker
  - Stadionul Iuliu Bodola in Oradea, Romania
