= Aleksandar Živković (footballer, born 1912) =

Croatian footballer (1912–2000)

Personal information
- Date of birth: 25 December 1912
- Place of birth: Orašje, Condominium of Bosnia and Herzegovina, Austria-Hungary
- Date of death: 25 February 2000 (aged 87)
- Place of death: Zagreb, Croatia
- Position: Striker

Senior career*
Years	Team	Apps	(Gls)
1928–1931	Concordia Zagreb		
1931–1932	Grasshoppers		
1932–1935	Građanski Zagreb	37	(27)
1935–1938	Racing Paris		
1938	CA Paris		
1938–1939	Sochaux	6	(3)

International career
1931–1935	Kingdom of Yugoslavia	15	(15)
1940	Banovina of Croatia	1	(0)
- * Club domestic league appearances and goals

Aleksandar Živković (25 December 1912 – 25 February 2000) was a Croatian footballer. Domestically, he played for Croatian clubs Concordia Zagreb and Građanski Zagreb, while abroad he played for Grasshopper Club Zürich and RCF Paris, CA Paris and FC Sochaux-Montbéliard.

== Club career ==
He was one of the top goalscorers in the Royal Yugoslavian championship with 34 goals from 1929 to 1935,

== International career ==
Živković was capped 15 times for the Yugoslavia national team and once for the Croatia national team in 1940.

Živković was one of seven Croatian players to boycott the Yugoslavia national team at the 1930 FIFA World Cup after the Football Association of Yugoslavia was moved from Zagreb to Belgrade. Živković made his international debut on 2 August 1931 (aged 18 years 7 months 8 days) against Czechoslovakia and scored the opening goal of a 2–1 win. Živković was the top scorer at the 1932 Balkan Cup, with five goals. He was also part of the Yugoslavia team that won the 1935 Balkan Cup, contributing with 2 goals. With 10 goals in the Balkan Cup, he is the shared third all-time top goal scorer in the competition's history, alongside Asen Panchev who also has 10, and only behind Bulgaria's Ljubomir Angelov (14) and Romania's Iuliu Bodola (15).

== After retirement ==
During the Second World War, Živković had served as a diplomat in the Independent State of Croatia's embassies in Berlin and Budapest. In 1945, after the war, he migrated to South Africa, where he lived until 1993, when he moved back to the newly independent Republic of Croatia. He died in Zagreb in 2000, aged 87, and was interred in Mirogoj cemetery.

== International goals ==
Yugoslavia score listed first, score column indicates score after each Živković goal.

List of international goals scored by Aleksandar Živković

#	Date	Venue	Opponent	Score	Result	Competition
1.	2 August 1931	Stadion SK Jugoslavija, Belgrade, Yugoslavia	Czechoslovakia	1–0	2–1	Friendly
2.	26 June 1932	Beogradski SK Stadium, Belgrade, Yugoslavia	Greece	5–1	7–1	1932 Balkan Cup
3.	26 June 1932	Beogradski SK Stadium, Belgrade, Yugoslavia	Greece	6–1	7–1	1932 Balkan Cup
4.	30 June 1932	Beogradski SK Stadium, Belgrade, Yugoslavia	Bulgaria	1–3	2–3	1932 Balkan Cup
5.	30 June 1932	Beogradski SK Stadium, Belgrade, Yugoslavia	Bulgaria	2–3	2–3	1932 Balkan Cup
6.	4 July 1932	Beogradski SK Stadium, Belgrade, Yugoslavia	Romania	2–0	3–1	1932 Balkan Cup
7.	9 October 1932	Stadion Letná, Prague, Czechoslovakia	Czechoslovakia	1–1	1–2	Friendly
8.	3 June 1933	Stadionul ONEF, Bucharest, Romania	Greece	3–1	5–3	1933 Balkan Cup
9.	3 June 1933	Stadionul ONEF, Bucharest, Romania	Greece	5–2	5–3	1933 Balkan Cup
10.	7 June 1933	ONEF Stadium, Bucharest, Romania	Bulgaria	2–0	4–0	1933 Balkan Cup
11.	1 April 1934	Beogradski SK Stadium, Belgrade, Yugoslavia	Bulgaria	2–1	2–3	Friendly
12.	3 August 1930	Yunak Stadium, Sofia, Bulgaria	Greece	1–0	6–1	1935 Balkan Cup
13.	3 August 1930	Yunak Stadium, Sofia, Bulgaria	Greece	4–1	6–1	1935 Balkan Cup
14.	18 August 1935	Stadion Wojska Polskiego, Warsaw, Poland	Poland	1–2	3–2	Friendly
15.	18 August 1935	Stadion Wojska Polskiego, Warsaw, Poland	Poland	2–2	3–2	Friendly

== Honours ==
Yugoslavia

- Balkan Cup: 1935; runner-up 1932, 1933

Individual

- Balkan Cup top scorer: 1932 with 5 goals

== Sources ==
- Nogometni leksikon (2004, in Croatian)
- Barreaud, Marc (1998). Dictionnaire des footballeurs étrangers du championnat professionnel français (1932–1997). L'Harmattan, Paris. ISBN 2-7384-6608-7.
