= 1931 Balkan Cup =

Tournament details
- Country: Bulgaria
- Venue(s): Stadion Slavia, Sofia
- Dates: 30 September – 4 October 1931
- Teams: 3

Final positions
- Champions: Bulgaria (1st title)
- Runners-up: Turkey
- Third place: Yugoslavia

Tournament statistics
- Matches played: 3
- Goals scored: 13 (4.33 per match)
- Top goal scorer(s): (Bulgaria) Asen Panchev (3 goals)
- All statistics correct as of 4 October 1931.

The 1931 Balkan Cup was an unofficial holding of the competition in which only three teams participated - Bulgaria, Yugoslavia and Turkey. It was played in 30 September – 4 October 1931 (i.e. before the 1929–31 tournament had been completed) and was won by Bulgaria. It featured three matches, all played in Stadion Slavia, Sofia.

== Final standings ==
Pos	Team	Pld	W	D	L	GF	GA	GD	Pts	
1	Bulgaria (C)	2	2	0	0	8	3	+5	4	Winners
2	Turkey	2	1	0	1	3	5	−2	2	
3	Yugoslavia	2	0	0	2	2	5	−3	0	

Source: RSSSF
(C) Champions

== Matches ==
30 September 1931

Bulgaria	5–1	Turkey
Lozanov 4'; Panchev 50', 76'; Stoyanov 56'; Peshev 80'	Report	Yeten 31'

Stadion Slavia, Sofia, Bulgaria
Attendance: 10,000
Referee: Mihaly Ivancsics (Hungary)

2 October 1931

Turkey	2–0	Yugoslavia
Erkal 7'; Arıcan 25'	Report

Stadion Slavia, Sofia, Bulgaria
Attendance: 8,000
Referee: Mihaly Ivancsics (Hungary)

4 October 1931

Bulgaria	3–2	Yugoslavia
Lozanov 50'; Angelov 56'; Panchev 86'	Report	Tirnanić 3'; Marjanović 50'

Stadion Slavia, Sofia, Bulgaria
Attendance: 15,000
Referee: Mihaly Ivancsics (Hungary)

== Winner ==
1931 Balkan Cup

Bulgaria
First title

== Statistics ==
=== Goalscorers ===
There were 13 goals scored in 3 matches, for an average of 4.33 goals per match.

3 goals

- (Bulgaria) Asen Panchev

2 goals

- (Bulgaria) Mihail Lozanov

1 goal

- (Bulgaria) Asen Peshev
- (Bulgaria) Ljubomir Angelov
- (Bulgaria) Velcho Stoyanov
- (Kingdom of Yugoslavia) Aleksandar Tirnanić
- (Kingdom of Yugoslavia) Blagoje Marjanović
- (Turkey) Hakkı Yeten
- (Turkey) Rebii Erkal
- (Turkey) Fikret Arıcan
