= Aleksandar Tirnanić =

Yugoslav footballer

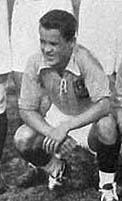
- Tirnanić at the 1930 FIFA World Cup

Personal information
- Date of birth: 15 July 1910
- Place of birth: Krnjevo, Kingdom of Serbia
- Date of death: 13 December 1992 (aged 82)
- Place of death: Belgrade, FR Yugoslavia
- Position: Winger

Youth career
- 1923: SK Olimpija
- 1924: SK Jugoslavija
- 1924–1927: BSK Belgrade

Senior career*
Years	Team	Apps	(Gls)
1927–1937	BSK Belgrade	77	(23)
1937–1938	SK Jugoslavija		
1938–1939	BASK	10	(2)
1939–1941	Jedinstvo Belgrade		
1942–1943	Sloga Belgrade		
Total		87	(25)

International career
1929–1940	Kingdom of Yugoslavia	50	(12)

Managerial career
- 1946–1948: Yugoslavia (co-manager)
- 1952–1961: Yugoslavia (co-manager)
Medal record
Men's Football
Representing Kingdom of Yugoslavia (as player)
FIFA World Cup
Third place	1930 Uruguay
Representing Yugoslavia (as manager)
UEFA European Championship
Runner-up	1960 France
Olympic Games
Gold medal – first place	1960 Rome
- * Club domestic league appearances and goals

Aleksandar "Tirke" Tirnanić (Serbian Cyrillic: Александар "Тирке" Тирнанић; 15 July 1910 – 13 December 1992) was a Serbian football player and manager. He earned a total of 50 caps, scoring 12 goals for Yugoslavia.

== Early life and beginnings ==
Born in the central Serbian small town of Krnjevo (Velika Plana municipality), Tirnanić was still in infancy when his working-class family moved to the capital Belgrade. He barely remembered his father, a metal factory worker who died in 1914 as part of the Serbian Army World War I effort.

Raised by a single mother, young Tirnanić quickly developed a love for football, which he played endlessly at Bara Venecija pitches on the Sava River's right bank. He got spotted there by coach Radenko Mitrović who brought the talented youngster to SK Jugoslavija youth setup. However, Tirnanić soon moved to arch crosstown rival BSK youth squad where he quickly developed into a notable right-winger. Realizing his potential, he completely immersed himself in football and abandoned school.

== Club career ==
He made his first-team senior debut as a 17-year-old, quickly marking himself out as an able and temperamental player, and forming a midfield partnership with Moša Marjanović.

Tirnanić spent most of his senior club career with BSK Beograd for which he appeared in 500 matches. During his career with BSK Tirnanić had great rivals Leo Lemešić (1924–1940) and Ljubo Benčić (1921–1935) who played for Hajduk Split. Additionally, he earned 50 caps and scored 12 goals for the Kingdom of Yugoslavia national team from 1929 to 1940. In 1937 he moved again to SK Jugoslavija where he played until 1938 when he joined BASK. For BASK he played from 1938 to 1939. He later played for two Belgrade based clubs Jedinstvo (1939–1941) and Sloga (1942–1943).

== International career ==
He also appeared in the 1930 FIFA World Cup. The day before he turned 20 he scored a goal, which made him at the time the youngest goalscorer in the World Cup. Later he has been beaten by Manuel Rosas in 1930, Pelé in 1958, Michael Owen in 1998, Dmitri Sychev in 2002 and latest Lionel Messi in 2006, which makes him the sixth youngest goalscorer in the FIFA World Cup. Later, he coached the Yugoslav team in two more World Cups, 1954 and 1958, the football tournaments at the Summer Olympics, 1948, 1952 and 1960 when Yugoslavia won gold medal, also appearing in the 1960 European Nations' Cup when Yugoslavia scored second place.

During the Balkan Cup, held in 1935 in Athens, Greece, Tirnanić and Tomašević were the top goalscorers of the tournament with 3 goals each. Thanks to these contributions Yugoslavia won the Balkan Cup in that edition, leaving behind Greece, Romania, and Bulgaria.

In the films Montevideo, God Bless You! (2010) and See You in Montevideo (2014), Tirnanić was portrayed by actor Miloš Biković.

=== International goals ===
Yugoslavia's goal tally first

#	Date	Venue	Opponent	Score	Result	Competition
1	13 April 1930	BSK Beograd Stadium, Belgrade, Yugoslavia	Bulgaria	3–1	6–1	Friendly
2	15 June 1930	Levski Field, Sofia, Bulgaria	Bulgaria	1–2	2–2	Friendly
3	14 July 1930	Estadio Gran Parque Central, Montevideo, Uruguay	Brazil	1–0	2–1	1930 FIFA World Cup
4	4 October 1931	Yunak Stadium, Sofia, Bulgaria	Bulgaria	1–0	2–3	1931 Balkan Cup
5	26 June 1932	BSK Beograd Stadium, Belgrade, Yugoslavia	Greece	1–1	7–1	1932 Balkan Cup
6	10 September 1933	Polish Army Stadium, Warsaw, Poland	Poland	3–4	3–4	Friendly
7	3 June 1934	BSK Beograd Stadium, Belgrade, Yugoslavia	Brazil	7–4	8–4	Friendly
8	25 December 1934	Leoforos Alexandras Stadium, Athens, Greece	Bulgaria	3–1	4–3	1934–35 Balkan Cup
9	25 December 1934	Leoforos Alexandras Stadium, Athens, Greece	Bulgaria	4–1	4–3	1934–35 Balkan Cup
10	1 January 1935	Leoforos Alexandras Stadium, Athens, Greece	Romania	1–0	4–0	1934–35 Balkan Cup
11	12 July 1936	Taksim Stadium, Istanbul, Turkey	Turkey	3–2	3–3	Friendly
12	6 September 1936	BSK Beograd Stadium, Belgrade, Yugoslavia	Poland	9–3	9–3	Friendly
