= Asen Peshev =

Bulgarian footballer

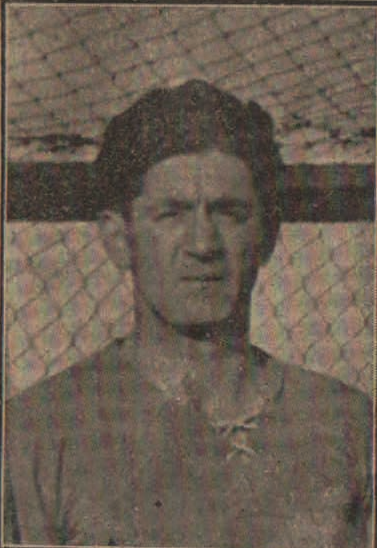

Personal information
- Date of birth: 5 March 1908
- Date of death: 28 June 1967 (aged 59)
- Position: Forward

Senior career*
Years	Team	Apps	(Gls)
1923–1924	Vladislav Sofia		
1924–1937	Levski Sofia	88	(83)
1937–1939	Moravská Slavia Brno	4	(0)
1939–1940	Levski Sofia	11	(3)
1940–1941	Vladislav Sofia		
Total		103	(86)

International career
1927–1936	Bulgaria	41	(12)
- * Club domestic league appearances and goals

Asen Peshev (Bulgarian: Асен Пешев) (5 March 1908-28 June 1967) was а Bulgarian footballer who played as a striker or left wing.

== Club career ==
He started playing in the Sofia club Vladislav in 1923. In 1924 he moved to Levski Sofia where he stayed thirteen seasons. He also played in Jidenitse and Moravska Slava Burno. In Levski he played ninety-nine games scoring a total of eighty-six goals.

== International career ==
On the Bulgaria national team he played during 1927-1936 in forty games (eighteen of which he was captain), scoring eleven goals without scoring a brace. He was declared the number 1 footballer in Bulgaria in 1931 in a survey of the popular players in the magazine Sport. He and Asen Panchev worked as a pair. He has been referred to as the King of the Volleys.

He was part of the Bulgaria team that won two back-to-back Balkan Cups in 1931 and in 1932, contributing with 1 and 2 goals respectively. He also scored once in the 1934-35 edition and twice in 1936, to bring his Balkan Cup goal tally total up to 9 goals, which puts him among the all-time top goal scorer in the competition's history. With 9 goals in the Balkan Cup, he falls just one short of teammate Asen Panchev, who has 10.

== Statistics ==
=== International ===
As of match played 24 November 1936.

Appearances and goals by national team and year
National team	Year	Apps	Goals
Bulgaria
Bulgaria	1927	1	0
Bulgaria	1929	4	0
Bulgaria	1930	6	2
Bulgaria	1931	6	2
Bulgaria	1932	9	4
Bulgaria	1933	3	0
Bulgaria	1934	5	1
Bulgaria	1935	5	3
Bulgaria	1936	2	0
Total		41	21

=== International goals ===
Bulgaria score listed first, score column indicates score after each Peshev goal.

List of international goals scored by Asen Peshev
No.	Date	Venue	Cap	Opponent	Score	Result	Competition
1	12 October 1930	Slavia Stadium, Sofia, Bulgaria	9	Romania	4–2	5–3	1929–31 Balkan Cup
2	7 December 1930	Leoforos Alexandras Stadium, Athens, Greece	11	Greece	1–5	1–6	1929–31 Balkan Cup
3	27 September 1931	Yunak Stadium, Sofia, Bulgaria	15	Turkey	4–1	5–1	1931 Balkan Cup
4	25 October 1931	Yunak Stadium, Sofia, Bulgaria	17	Turkey	2–1	2–1	1929–31 Balkan Cup
5	26 June 1932	Beogradski SK Stadium, Belgrade, Yugoslavia	23	Romania	1–0	2–0	1932 Balkan Cup
6	2 July 1932	Beogradski SK Stadium, Belgrade, Yugoslavia	25	Greece	2–0	2–0	1932 Balkan Cup
7	4 November 1932	Taksim Stadium, Istanbul, Turkey	26	Turkey	2–2	3–2	Friendly
8	25 December 1934	Leoforos Alexandras Stadium, Athens, Greece	33	Yugoslavia	1–0	3–4	1934–35 Balkan Cup
9	16 June 1935	Yunak Stadium, Sofia, Bulgaria	36	Greece	1–1	5–2	1935 Balkan Cup
10	19 June 1935	Yunak Stadium, Sofia, Bulgaria	37	Romania	3–0	4–0	1935 Balkan Cup
11	19 June 1935	VfB Stadium, Leipzig, Germany	39	Germany	2–2	2–4	Friendly

== Honours ==
=== Club ===
Levski Sofia

- Bulgarian First League: 1933, 1937
- Sofia Championship: 1924–25, 1928–29, 1932–33, 1936–37
- Tsar's Cup: 1933, 1937
- Ulpia Serdika Cup: 1926, 1930, 1931, 1932

=== International ===
Bulgaria

- Balkan Cup: 1931, 1932

=== Individual ===
- Bulgarian First League Top-scorer: 1933 (27 goals)
- Bulgarian Footballer of the Year: 1931
