= Petre Sucitulescu =

Romanian footballer

Personal information
- Date of birth: Unknown
- Place of birth: Unknown
- Date of death: 20 September 1941
- Place of death: Dalnik, Soviet Ukraine
- Position: Defender

Senior career*
| Years | Team | Apps | (Gls) |
| 1932 | Teișor București | | |
| 1932–1939 | Unirea Tricolor București (Note: The statistics for the 1938–39 Divizia B season are unavailable.) | 89 | (3) |
| 1940 | Olympia București | | |
| 1941 | Sportul Studențesc București | 4 | (0) |
| Total | | 93 | (3) |

International career
| 1934–1935 | Romania | 4 | (0) |
- * Club domestic league appearances and goals

Petre Sucitulescu (died 20 September 1941) was a Romanian football defender and a World War II soldier. Sucitulescu was one of the five players who played for Unirea Tricolor București and were incorporated to fight for the Romanian Armed Forces in World War II. With the exception of Constantin Anghelache, the others, Gicu Cristescu, Traian Ionescu and Andrei Alecu died. In September 1941 Sucitulescu died while fighting in Dalnik on the Eastern Front.

== International career ==
Petre Sucitulescu played four games at international level for Romania. He made his debut at the 1934–35 Balkan Cup under coach Alexandru Săvulescu, playing in two games, the first one was a 3–2 victory against Bulgaria and the second was a 4–0 loss against Yugoslavia. His following two games were at the 1935 Balkan Cup, appearing in a 2–0 loss against Yugoslavia and in 4–0 loss against Bulgaria.

== Honours ==
Unirea Tricolor București

- Divizia B: 1938–39
- Cupa României runner-up: 1935–36
