= Aleksandar Živković =

Aleksandar Živković may refer to two footballers:

- Aleksandar Živković (footballer, born 1912), who played 15 times for Yugoslavia
- Aleksandar Živković (footballer, born 1977), who played twice for FR Yugoslavia
