= Lucian Gruin =

Romanian footballer

Personal information
- Date of birth: 31 October 1913
- Place of birth: Temesvár, Austria-Hungary
- Date of death: 12 May 1994 (aged 80)
- Position: Striker

Senior career*
Years	Team	Apps	(Gls)
1932–1934	Dacia Timișoara		
1934–1935	Chinezul Timișoara	20	(6)
1935–1938	Venus București	56	(21)
1938–1940	Luceafărul București		
1940–1941	Arsenal București		
Total		76	(27)

International career
1935	Romania	1	(1)
- * Club domestic league appearances and goals

Lucian Gruin (31 October 1913 – 12 May 1994) was a Romanian footballer who played as a striker.

== Club career ==
Gruin was born on 31 October 1913 in Temesvár, Austria-Hungary (now Romania), and began playing football in 1932 at local club Dacia. Three years later he went to Chinezul Timișoara where he made his Divizia A debut on 16 September 1934 under coach Jozsef Wana in a 6–5 victory against Ripensia Timișoara.

One year later he switched teams again, going to Venus București. He won the championship with Venus in the 1936–37 season, coach Ferenc Plattkó giving him 22 appearances in which he scored 10 goals. Afterwards he played in the first match of a Romanian team in a European competition, scoring once in the 6–4 loss to Újpest in the first leg in the first round of the 1937 Mitropa Cup. On 13 March 1938, Gruin made his last Divizia A appearance in a 1–0 home loss to Ripensia, totaling 76 matches with 27 goals in the competition.

He ended his career in 1941 after spending a few years in the Romanian lower leagues, playing for Luceafărul București and Arsenal București.

== International career ==
Gruin played one match for Romania, scoring a goal, when coach Constantin Rădulescu used him the entire match in a 2–2 draw against Greece in the 1935 Balkan Cup.

=== International goals ===
Scores and results list Romania's goal tally first. "Score" column indicates the score after each Lucian Gruin goal.

#	Date	Venue	Opponent	Score	Result	Competition
1.	24 June 1935	Levski Field, Sofia, Bulgaria	Greece	2–2	2–2	1935 Balkan Cup

== Death ==
Gruin died on 12 May 1994 at age 80.

== Honours ==
Venus București

- Divizia A: 1936–37
