= 1932 Balkan Cup =

Tournament details
- Country: Yugoslavia
- Venue(s): Beogradski SK Stadium, Belgrade
- Dates: 26 June – 3 July 1932
- Teams: 4

Final positions
- Champions: Bulgaria (2nd title)
- Runners-up: Yugoslavia
- Third place: Romania

Tournament statistics
- Matches played: 6
- Goals scored: 24 (4 per match)
- Top goal scorer(s): (Kingdom of Yugoslavia) Aleksandar Živković (5 goals)
- All statistics correct as of 4 August 1932.

The 1932 Balkan Cup was the third Balkan Cup football tournament. The national teams of Yugoslavia, Greece, Bulgaria and Romania took part and it was won by Bulgaria. The top goalscorer was Živković, with Yugoslavia.

== Final standings ==
Pos	Team	Pld	W	D	L	GF	GA	GR	Pts	Qualification
1	Bulgaria (C)	3	3	0	0	7	2	3.500	6	Winners
2	Yugoslavia	3	2	0	1	12	5	2.400	4	
3	Romania	3	1	0	2	4	5	0.800	2	
4	Greece	3	0	0	3	1	12	0.083	0	

Source: EU.football
(C) Champions

== Matches ==
26 June 1932

Yugoslavia	7–1	Greece
Tirnanić 5'; Glišović 15'; Zečević 51', 84'; Živković 51' (pen.), 62' (pen.); Vujadinović 80'	Report	Kitsos 4'

Beogradski SK Stadium, Belgrade, Yugoslavia
Attendance: 10,000
Referee: Denis Xifando (Romania)

26 June 1932

Bulgaria	2–0	Romania
Peshev 65'; Panchev 89'	Report

Beogradski SK Stadium, Belgrade, Yugoslavia
Attendance: 5,000
Referee: Mika Popović (Yugoslavia)

28 June 1932

Greece	0–3	Romania
	Report	Ciolac 6'; Schwartz 9'; Bodola 16'

Beogradski SK Stadium, Belgrade, Yugoslavia
Attendance: 2,500
Referee: Stefan Chumpalov (Bulgaria)

30 June 1932

Yugoslavia	2–3	Bulgaria
Živković 84', 89'	Report	Angelov 4'; Panchev 35'; Lozanov 47'

Beogradski SK Stadium, Belgrade, Yugoslavia
Attendance: 6,000
Referee: Stavros Hatzopoulos (Greece)

2 July 1932

Bulgaria	2–0	Greece
Angelov 71'; Peshev 85' (pen.)	Report

Beogradski SK Stadium, Belgrade, Yugoslavia
Attendance: 3,500
Referee: Radu Istrate (Romania)

4 July 1932

Yugoslavia	3–1	Romania
Zečević 21'; Živković 30'; Vujadinović 42'	Report	Kovács 36'

Beogradski SK Stadium, Belgrade, Yugoslavia
Attendance: 8,000
Referee: Stavros Hatzopoulos (Greece)

== Winner ==
1932 Balkan Cup

Bulgaria
Second title

== Statistics ==
=== Goalscorers ===
There were 24 goals scored in 6 matches, for an average of 4 goals per match.

5 goals

- (Kingdom of Yugoslavia) Aleksandar Živković

3 goals

- (Kingdom of Yugoslavia) Dobrivoje Zečević

2 goals

- (Bulgaria) Asen Panchev
- (Bulgaria) Asen Peshev
- (Bulgaria) Ljubomir Angelov
- (Kingdom of Yugoslavia) Đorđe Vujadinović

1 goal

- (Bulgaria) Mihail Lozanov
- (Greece) Nikos Kitsos
- (Kingdom of Yugoslavia) Aleksandar Tirnanić
- (Kingdom of Yugoslavia) Svetislav Glišović
- (Romania) Gheorghe Ciolac
- (Romania) Iuliu Bodola
- (Romania) Sándor Schwartz
- (Romania) Nicolae Kovács
