= 1936 Balkan Cup =

Tournament details
- Country: Romania
- Venue(s): Stadionul Oficiul Naţional de Educaţie Fizică, Bucharest
- Dates: 17–24 May 1936
- Teams: 3

Final positions
- Champions: Romania (3rd title)
- Runners-up: Bulgaria
- Third place: Greece

Tournament statistics
- Matches played: 3
- Goals scored: 21 (7 per match)
- Top goal scorer(s): (Romania) Sándor Schwartz (4 goals)

The 1936 Balkan Cup was the seventh Balkan Cup football tournament. The national teams of Greece, Bulgaria and Romania took part and it was won by Romania, also host of the tournament. The top goalscorer was Sándor Schwartz from Romania with 4 goals.

== Final table ==
Pos	Team	Pld	W	D	L	GF	GA	GR	Pts	Qualification
1	Romania (C)	2	2	0	0	9	3	3.000	4	Winners
2	Bulgaria	2	1	0	1	6	8	0.750	2	
3	Greece	2	0	0	2	6	10	0.600	0	

Source: EU.football
(C) Champions

== Matches ==
17 May 1936

Romania	5–2	Greece
Bodola 21', 85'; Schwartz 37', 75'; Dobay 77'	Report	Vazos 31'; Simeonidis 76'

Stadionul Oficiul Naţional de Educaţie Fizică,
Bucharest
Attendance: 15,000
Referee: Peco Bauwens (Germany)

21 May 1936

Bulgaria	5–4	Greece
Panchev 25', 76'; Rafailov 31'; Angelov 31'; Lozanov 73'	Report	Migiakis 12'; Vikelidis 69'; Choumis 84', 86'

Stadionul Oficiul Naţional de Educaţie Fizică,
Bucharest
Attendance: 20,000
Referee: Peco Bauwens (Germany)

24 May 1936

Romania	4–1	Bulgaria
Schwartz 10', 55'; Ciolac 66'; Dobay 78'	Report	Angelov 35'

Stadionul Oficiul Naţional de Educaţie Fizică,
Bucharest
Attendance: 20,000
Referee: Peco Bauwens (Germany)

== Winner ==
1936 Balkan Cup

Romania
Third title

== Statistics ==
=== Goalscorers ===
There were 21 goals scored in 3 matches, for an average of 7 goals per match.

4 goals

- (Romania) Sándor Schwartz

2 goals

- (Bulgaria) Asen Panchev
- (Bulgaria) Ljubomir Angelov
- (Greece) Kostas Choumis
- (Romania) Iuliu Bodola
- (Romania) Ștefan Dobay

1 goal

- (Bulgaria) Penko Rafailov
- (Bulgaria) Mihail Lozanov
- (Greece) Giannis Vazos
- (Greece) Theologos Simeonidis
- (Greece) Antonis Migiakis
- (Greece) Kleanthis Vikelidis
- (Romania) Gheorghe Ciolac
