= Ștefan Dobay =

Romanian footballer and manager

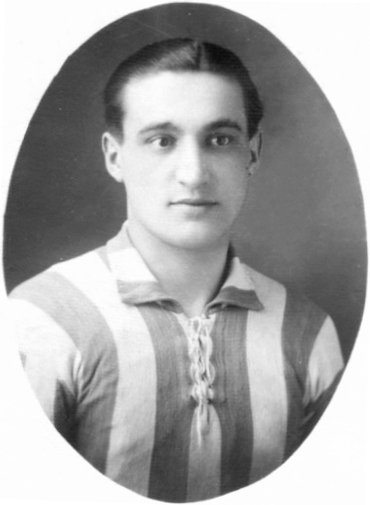

Personal information
- Date of birth: 26 September 1909
- Place of birth: Újszentes, Austria-Hungary
- Date of death: 7 April 1994 (aged 84)
- Place of death: Târgu Mureș, Romania
- Height: 1.78 m (5 ft 10 in)
- Position: Striker

Senior career*
Years	Team	Apps	(Gls)
1924–1926	Unirea CFR Timișoara		
1926–1929	Banatul Timișoara		
1930–1940	Ripensia Timișoara	153	(127)
1940–1941	Kolozsvári AC		
1941–1942	Törekvés SE		
1945–1948	CSM Mediaș (Note: Only statistics for the 1947–48 Divizia A season are available.)	7	(3)
Total		160	(130)

International career
1930–1939	Romania	41	(19)

Managerial career
- 1945–1948: CSM Mediaș (player/coach)
- 1948: CFR Constanța
- 1949: Dezrobirea Constanța
- 1949: Farul Constanța
- 1950: Locomotiva Târgu Mureș
- 1951: Flacăra Mediaș
- 1952–1953: Locomotiva Târgu Mureș
- 1953–1954: Romania
- 1954: Dinamo Orașul Stalin
- 1955: Locomotiva Târgu Mureș
- 1955–1956: CCA București
- 1957: CFR Cluj
- 1958: UTA Arad
- * Club domestic league appearances and goals

Ștefan Dobay (Hungarian: Dobay István, 26 September 1909 – 7 April 1994), was a Romanian footballer who played as a striker and manager.

He mostly played for Ripensia Timișoara and Romania's national team for whom he got 41 caps and netted 19 goals, appearing in the 1934 and 1938 World Cups, scoring goals in each tournament.

== Club career ==
Dobay, nicknamed "Calul" (The Horse), was born on 26 September 1909 in Újszentes, Austria-Hungary (today Dumbrăvița, Romania). In 1916, he lost his father on the battlefields of World War I.

On 26 September 1924 when he turned 15, Dobay made his debut in senior football, playing for Unirea CFR Timișoara in a 5–2 victory against Jimbolia. In 1926 he moved to neighboring club Banatul, managing in the 1928–29 season to reach the semi-finals of the national league where they were defeated with 3–0 by România Cluj.

In 1930, Dobay joined Ripensia Timișoara where in his first five seasons he was four times the top-scorer of the season, in the 1936–37 edition sharing the first place with Traian Iordache. He won the championship title in the 1932–33 season, coach Jenő Konrád using him in 14 games in which he scored 16 goals, including a hat-trick in the final against Universitatea Cluj. In the following season he netted a personal record of 25 goals to help his side earn a runner-up position in the league and the team won the 1934 Cupa României final, Dobay playing in both wins over "U" Cluj, scoring three goals. In the 1934–35 season he won another title, coaches Josef Uridil and Rudolf Wetzer giving him 22 appearances in which he netted 24 goals, also the team reached the Cupa României final where he scored once in the 6–5 loss to CFR București. Next season, Dobay helped Ripensia win The Double, being given 21 appearances by coaches Wetzer and Konrád, scoring 12 times, also opening the score in the 5–1 win over Unirea Tricolor București in the Cupa României final. In the following Cupa României edition, the team reached another final in which he netted his side's goal in the 5–1 loss to Rapid București. In the 1937–38 season, Ripensia won another title, coach Sepp Pojar using him in 28 matches in which he scored eight times. Afterwards he closed the score after receiving an assist from Gheorghe Ciolac in Ripensia's 3–0 win over AC Milan in the first leg of the first round of the 1938 Mitropa Cup, helping the team get past the Italians.

In 1940 he switched teams, going to Nemzeti Bajnokság II club, Kolozsvári AC. After one year he moved to Törekvés SE in the same league, helping it earn first place. In 1945, Dobay went as a player-coach to newly founded club, CSM Mediaș, helping it earn promotion to the first league two years later. Afterwards he made his last Divizia A appearance on 11 April 1948 in Mediaș's 3–0 away loss to ASA București.

== International career ==
Dobay played 41 matches and scored 19 goals for Romania, making his debut on 25 May 1930 under coach Constantin Rădulescu in a 8–1 home victory against Greece in the successful 1929–31 Balkan Cup. He was considered for the squad that went to the 1930 World Cup, but eventually was left home. Dobay won his second Balkan Cup in 1933 when he netted four goals, including a brace in a 7–0 win over Bulgaria, the only goal in a victory against Greece and one goal in a 5–0 win against Yugoslavia, being the top-scorer of the competition alongside teammate Gheorghe Ciolac.

Dobay scored two goals in the successful 1934 World Cup qualifiers, the first in a 2–2 draw against Switzerland and the second in a 2–1 home win over Yugoslavia. Afterwards he was selected by coaches Rădulescu and Josef Uridil to be part of the squad that went to the final tournament in Italy, scoring his side's goal in the 2–1 defeat to eventual finalists Czechoslovakia in the first round. After the game, goalkeeper František Plánička said:"If Romania had another player like Dobay I would have had to split myself in two."

He won his third Balkan Cup in 1936, contributing with two goals netted in two victories against Greece and Bulgaria. He was selected by coaches Săvulescu and Rădulescu to be part of the squad that participated in the 1938 World Cup. Dobay scored once in each game against Cuba, the first one being a 3–3 draw, followed by a surprising 2–1 loss in the replay. On 11 June 1939 he made his last appearance for The Tricolours in a friendly that ended with a 1–0 home loss to Italy.

=== International goals ===
Romania score listed first, score column indicates score after each Dobay goal.

List of international goals scored by Ștefan Dobay
No.	Date	Venue	Opponent	Score	Result	Competition
1	25 May 1930	ONEF Stadium, Bucharest, Romania	Greece	7–1	8–1	Friendly
2	4 June 1933	ONEF Stadium, Bucharest, Romania	Bulgaria	2–0	7–0	1933 Balkan Cup
3	4 June 1933	ONEF Stadium, Bucharest, Romania	Bulgaria	5–0	7–0	1933 Balkan Cup
4	8 June 1933	ONEF Stadium, Bucharest, Romania	Greece	2–0	2–1	1933 Balkan Cup
5	11 June 1933	ONEF Stadium, Bucharest, Romania	Yugoslavia	5–0	5–0	1933 Balkan Cup
6	29 October 1933	Wankdorf Stadium, Bern, Switzerland	Switzerland	1–0	2–2	1934 World Cup qualifiers
7	25 March 1934	Pardubický Stadion, Pardubice, Czechoslovakia	Czechoslovakia	2–1	2–2	1931–1934 Central European Cup for Amateurs
8	29 April 1934	ONEF Stadium, Bucharest, Romania	Yugoslavia	2–1	2–1	1934 World Cup qualifiers
9	27 May 1934	Stadio Littorio, Trieste, Italy	Czechoslovakia	1–0	1–2	1934 World Cup
10	14 October 1934	Czarnych, Lwow, Poland (now Lviv, Ukraine)	Poland	1–1	3–3	Friendly
11	14 October 1934	Czarnych, Lwow, Poland (now Lviv, Ukraine)	Poland	3–3	3–3	Friendly
12	27 December 1934	Leoforos Alexandras Stadium, Athens, Greece	Greece	1–0	2–2	1934–35 Balkan Cup
13	17 May 1936	ONEF Stadium, Bucharest, Romania	Greece	4–2	5–2	1936 Balkan Cup
14	24 May 1936	ONEF Stadium, Bucharest, Romania	Bulgaria	4–1	4–1	1936 Balkan Cup
15	4 July 1937	Stadion Miejski, Łódź, Poland	Poland	1–1	2–4	1934–35 Balkan Cup
16	5 June 1938	Parc de Sports du T.O.E.C., Toulouse, France	Cuba	3–3	3–3	1938 World Cup
17	9 June 1938	Parc de Sports du T.O.E.C., Toulouse, France	Cuba	1–0	1–2	1938 World Cup
18	7 May 1939	ONEF Stadium, Bucharest, Romania	Yugoslavia	1–0	1–0	King Carol II Cup 1939
19	18 May 1939	Stadionul Venus, Bucharest, Romania	Latvia	2–0	4–0	Friendly

== Managerial career ==
In 1945, Dobay went as a player-coach to a newly founded club, CSM Mediaș, helping it earn promotion to the first league two years later. Afterwards, at the end of the 1947–48 season, he managed to keep Mediaș in Divizia A.

In 1948 he went to work at CFR Constanța, one year later moving to Dezrobirea and then to Farul. In the early 1950s he had three spells at Locomotiva Târgu Mureș. He also made a comeback to Mediaș in the second league with whom he reached the 1951 Cupa României final that was lost with 3–1 to CCA București and had a short spell at Dinamo Orașul Stalin. Dobay also coached Romania's national team, making his debut in a 1–0 home loss to Czechoslovakia in the 1954 World Cup qualifiers. He then led The Tricolours in two friendly games, a victory against East Germany and a loss to rivals Hungary.

He went to CCA București with whom, alongside Ilie Savu he won the 1955 Cupa României after a 6–3 victory against Progresul Oradea in the final. In the following season he led The Military Men to win the 1956 championship. In 1957 he worked at CFR Cluj in Divizia B.

== Style of play ==
Dobay was known for his powerful shot, Juventus București captain, Coloman Braun-Bogdan described an incident in a game with Ripensia that took place in the 1935–36 season:"In the 8th minute, Ghiță Ciolac opened the lane for Dobay, and The Horse took off at a gallop! Then, after getting past Nicky Petrescu, from about 10 meters he sent his shot towards Enderffi's goal. Well, my dears, that shot was not a shot, but a real thunderbolt! The ball broke the net of the goal and went out. I can tell you with my hand on my heart that in my entire life I have never seen such a powerful shot. The ball went like a cannonball and I think it would have knocked anyone who would have met it on the way to the ground. The stands started applauding frantically." During those times, there were rumors that his powerful shots killed animals or goalkeepers, Dobay responded by saying:"I made football an art. And through my art I wanted to convey a piece of beauty to people. Dobay laid many defenders to the ground with his powerful shot, he also tore goal nets, probably a bit rotten, but he never even killed a sparrow, let alone a monkey or a goalkeeper." In a 1966 interview with journalist Ioan Chirilă he said:"I would launch like a slingshot without looking back – I knew that Șubi (Schwartz) would make a couple of feints to simulate a pass to the opposite side and I would suddenly find myself with the ball in front of me, but such a perfect ball, on the stride! Once I received the ball, I would speed down towards the goal. I was never too technical. I was not good at finesse. I knew one thing: throw the ball sideways, and bypass the opponent economically, on a tangent, then hit it all at speed."

== Death ==
Dobay died on 7 April 1994 in Târgu Mureș at age 84.

== Legacy ==
A stadium in his native Dumbrăvița is named after him.

== Honours ==
=== Player ===
Ripensia Timișoara

- Divizia A: 1932–33, 1934–35, 1935–36, 1937–38, runner-up 1933–34, 1938–39
- Cupa României: 1933–34, 1935–36, runner-up 1934–35, 1936–37

Romania

- Balkan Cup: 1929–31, 1933, 1936

Törekvés SE

- Nemzeti Bajnokság II: 1941–42

=== Individual ===
- Divizia A top-scorer: 1932–33, 1933–34, 1934–35, 1936–37 (joint with Traian Iordache)

=== Manager ===
Flacăra Mediaș

- Cupa României runner-up: 1951

CCA București

- Divizia A: 1956
- Cupa României: 1955

== Selected publications ==
- Dobay, Ștefan (2014). Șut... goool!. Artprint. ISBN 978-9-7376-3936-3.
