= 1935 Balkan Cup =

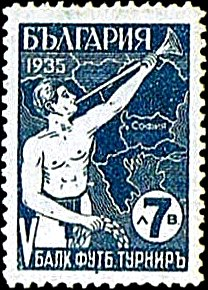
- Bulgarian stamp produced to mark the Cup

Tournament details
- Country: Bulgaria
- Venue(s): Levski Stadium & Yunak Stadium, Sofia
- Dates: 16–24 June 1935
- Teams: 4

Final positions
- Champions: Yugoslavia (2nd title)
- Runners-up: Bulgaria
- Third place: Greece

Tournament statistics
- Matches played: 6
- Goals scored: 30 (5 per match)
- Top goal scorer(s): (Bulgaria) Ljubomir Angelov (6 goals)

The 1935 Balkan Cup was the sixth Balkan Cup football tournament. The national teams of Yugoslavia, Greece, Bulgaria and Romania took part and Yugoslavia won it. At the end of the tournament, Yugoslavia were declared winners because of their better goal average (the standard tie-breaker at the time); Bulgaria protested, stating that if the match between Yugoslavia and Romania had finished regularly, the former's goal record might have changed, but after a one-year procedure, the protest was rejected and Yugoslavia remained winners. The host of the tournament was Bulgaria. The top goal scorer was Ljubomir Angelov from Bulgaria with 6 goals in the form of two hat-tricks.

== Final table ==
Pos	Team	Pld	W	D	L	GF	GA	GR	Pts	Qualification
1	Yugoslavia (C)	3	2	1	0	11	4	2.750	5	Winners
2	Bulgaria	3	2	1	0	12	5	2.400	5	
3	Greece	3	0	1	2	5	13	0.385	1	
4	Romania	3	0	1	2	2	8	0.250	1	

(C) Champions

== Matches ==
16 June 1935
17:30 (+2:00)

Bulgaria	5–2	Greece
Peshev 23'; Angelov 26', 28', 63'; Lozanov 68'	Report	Choumis 21', 74'

Yunak Stadium, Sofia
Attendance: 12,000
Referee: Constantin Rădulescu (Romania)

17 June 1935
19:00 (+2:00)

Romania	0–2	Yugoslavia
	Report	Marjanović 33'; Sekulić 56'

Yunak Stadium, Sofia
Attendance: 10,000
Referee: Stavros Hatzopoulos (Greece)

Match abandoned at 0–2 in the 78th minute due to a thunderstorm

19 June 1935
17:30 (+2:00)

Bulgaria	4–0	Romania
Lozanov 11'; Yordanov 33'; Peshev 49'; Sucitulescu 62' (o.g.)	Report

Yunak Stadium, Sofia
Attendance: 10,000
Referee: Stavros Hatzopoulos (Greece)

21 June 1935
17:30 (+2:00)

Greece	1–6	Yugoslavia
Baltasis 49'	Report	Živković 31', 70'; Marjanović 33'; Vujadinović 49'; Glišović 81', 83'

Yunak Stadium, Sofia
Attendance: 5,000
Referee: Nikola Dosev (Bulgaria)

24 June 1935
16:00 (+2:00)

Greece	2–2	Romania
Choumis 10', 15'	Report	Bodola 26'; Gruin 26'

Levski Stadium, Sofia
Attendance: 1,000
Referee: Nikola Dosev (Bulgaria)

24 June 1935

Bulgaria	3–3	Yugoslavia
Angelov 25', 28', 66'	Report	Marjanović 2'; Vujadinović 19', 75'

Yunak Stadium, Sofia
Attendance: 25,000
Referee: Stavros Hatzopoulos (Greece)

== Winner ==
1935 Balkan Cup

Yugoslavia
Second title

== Statistics ==
=== Goalscorers ===
There were 30 goals scored in 6 matches, for an average of 5 goals per match.

6 goals

- (Bulgaria) Ljubomir Angelov

4 goals

- (Greece) Kostas Choumis

3 goals

- (Kingdom of Yugoslavia) Blagoje Marjanović
- (Kingdom of Yugoslavia) Đorđe Vujadinović

2 goals

- (Bulgaria) Asen Peshev
- (Bulgaria) Mihail Lozanov
- (Kingdom of Yugoslavia) Aleksandar Živković
- (Kingdom of Yugoslavia) Svetislav Glišović

1 goal

- (Bulgaria) Vuchko Yordanov
- (Kingdom of Yugoslavia) Branislav Sekulić
- (Greece) Mitsos Baltasis
- (Romania) Iuliu Bodola
- (Romania) Lucian Gruin

1 own goal

- (Romania) Petre Sucitulescu (against Bulgaria)
