= 1934–35 Balkan Cup =

Tournament details
- Country: Greece
- Venue(s): Leoforos Alexandras Stadium, Athens
- Dates: 23 December 1934 – 1 January 1935
- Teams: 4

Final positions
- Champions: Yugoslavia (1st title)
- Runners-up: Greece
- Third place: Romania

Tournament statistics
- Matches played: 6
- Goals scored: 26 (4.33 per match)
- Top goal scorer(s): (Kingdom of Yugoslavia) Aleksandar Tirnanić (Kingdom of Yugoslavia) Aleksandar Tomašević (3 goals)

The 1934–35 Balkan Cup was the fifth Balkan Cup football tournament. The national teams of Yugoslavia, Greece, Bulgaria and Romania took part and it was won by Yugoslavia. The host of the tournament was Greece and they lost the trophy on the final day on January 1, defeated to Bulgaria by 1–2 as previously on the day Yugoslavia had thrashed Romania by 4–0. This was the first Balkan Cup for Yugoslavia. The top goalscorers were Aleksandar Tirnanić and Aleksandar Tomašević (both from Yugoslavia) with 3 goals each.

== Final table ==
Pos	Team	Pld	W	D	L	GF	GA	GR	Pts	Qualification
1	Yugoslavia (C)	3	2	0	1	9	5	1.800	4	Winners
2	Greece	3	1	1	1	5	5	1.000	3	
3	Romania	3	1	1	1	5	8	0.625	3	
4	Bulgaria	3	1	0	2	7	8	0.875	2	

Source: EU.football
(C) Champions

== Matches ==
23 December 1934

Greece	2–1	Yugoslavia
Vazos 39'; L. Andrianopoulos 67'	Report	Sekulić 12'

Leoforos Alexandras Stadium,
Athens
Attendance: 18,000
Referee: Constantin Rădulescu (Romania)

25 December 1934

Bulgaria	3–4	Yugoslavia
Peshev 1'; Todorov 23'; Panchev 78'	Report	Sekulić 3'; Tomašević 7'; Tirnanić 28', 48'

Leoforos Alexandras Stadium,
Athens
Attendance: 6,000
Referee: Sotiris Asprogerakas (Greece)

27 December 1934

Greece	2–2	Romania
L. Andrianopoulos 14'; Choumis 75'	Report	Dobay 5'; Ciolac 13'

Leoforos Alexandras Stadium,
Athens
Attendance: 15,000
Referee: Nikola Dosev (Bulgaria)

30 December 1934

Bulgaria	2–3	Romania
Angelov 44', 51'	Report	Bodola 14', 31'; Ciolac 37'

Leoforos Alexandras Stadium,
Athens
Attendance: 2,500
Referee: Sotiris Asprogerakas (Greece)

1 January 1935

Greece	1–2	Bulgaria
Vazos 51'	Report	Lozanov 44'; Panchev 84'

Leoforos Alexandras Stadium,
Athens
Attendance: 20,000
Referee: Bora Vasiljević (Yugoslavia)

1 January 1935

Romania	0–4	Yugoslavia
	Report	Tirnanić 10'; Marjanović 34'; Tomašević 67', 83'

Leoforos Alexandras Stadium,
Athens
Attendance: 25,000
Referee: Stavros Hatzopoulos (Greece)

== Winner ==
1934-35 Balkan Cup

Yugoslavia
First title

== Statistics ==
=== Goalscorers ===
There were 26 goals scored in 6 matches, for an average of 4.33 goals per match.

3 goals

- (Kingdom of Yugoslavia) Aleksandar Tomašević
- (Kingdom of Yugoslavia) Aleksandar Tirnanić

2 goals

- (Bulgaria) Asen Panchev
- (Bulgaria) Ljubomir Angelov
- (Greece) Leonidas Andrianopoulos
- (Greece) Giannis Vazos
- (Kingdom of Yugoslavia) Branislav Sekulić
- (Romania) Gheorghe Ciolac
- (Romania) Iuliu Bodola

1 goal

- (Bulgaria) Asen Peshev
- (Bulgaria) Mihail Lozanov
- (Bulgaria) Vladimir Todorov
- (Greece) Kostas Choumis
- (Kingdom of Yugoslavia) Blagoje Marjanović
- (Romania) Ștefan Dobay
