= 1929–31 Balkan Cup =

Tournament details
- Dates: 6 October 1929 – 29 November 1931
- Teams: 4

Final positions
- Champions: Romania (1st title)
- Runners-up: Yugoslavia
- Third place: Greece
- Fourth place: Bulgaria

Tournament statistics
- Matches played: 12
- Goals scored: 61 (5.08 per match)
- Top goal scorer(s): (Romania) Iuliu Bodola (Romania) Rudolf Wetzer (7 goals)

The 1929–31 Balkan Cup was the competition's first edition. Four teams participated: Romania, Greece, Yugoslavia, and Bulgaria. Romania won the trophy ahead of second placed Yugoslavia. Greece came third and Bulgaria was last. The best goalscorers were Bodola and Wetzer, both from Romania and with 7 goals each. Albania had registered for the tournament, but retired before the beginning and did not participate.

== Standings ==
Pos	Team	Pld	W	D	L	GF	GA	GD	Pts	
1	Romania (C)	6	5	0	1	26	13	+13	10	Winners
2	Yugoslavia	6	3	0	3	12	9	+3	6	
3	Greece	6	2	0	4	13	20	−7	4	
4	Bulgaria	6	2	0	4	10	19	−9	4	

Source: RSSSF
(C) Champions

== Matches ==
6 October 1929
16:00 (+1:44)

Romania	2–1	Yugoslavia
Sepi 32'; Ciolac 40'	Report	Marjanović 71'

Stadionul ONEF, Bucuresti, Romania
Referee: Georgi Grigorov (Bulgaria)

26 January 1930
15:30 (UTC+2:00)

Greece	2–1	Yugoslavia
G. Andrianopulos 55'; D. Andrianopulos 59'	Report	Vujadinović 18'

Leoforos Alexandras Stadium, Athens, Greece
Attendance: 10,000
Referee: Nikola Dosev (Bulgaria)

25 May 1930
14:00 (+1:44)

Romania	8–1	Greece
Wetzer 8', 34', 75', 76', 80'; Vogl 43'; Raffinsky 57' (pen.); Dobay 77'	Report	V. Andrianopoulos 15'

Stadionul ONEF, Bucuresti, Romania
Attendance: 15,000
Referee: Jovan Ružić (Yugoslavia)

12 October 1930
16:00 (+2:00)

Bulgaria	5–3	Romania
Staykov 11' (pen.), 52'; Stoyanov 34', 50'; Peshev 47'	Report	Wetzer 23' (pen.), 43'; Gikov 71' (o.g.)

Stadion Slavia, Sofia, Bulgaria
Attendance: 10,000
Referee: Jovan Ružić (Yugoslavia)

16 November 1930
15:00 (+2:00)

Bulgaria	0–3	Yugoslavia
	Report	Lemešić 7'; Marjanović 27'; Praunsberger 78'

Stadion Slavia, Sofia, Bulgaria
Attendance: 15,000
Referee: Jovan Ružić (Yugoslavia)

7 December 1930
15:00 (+2:00)

Greece	6–1	Bulgaria
Tsolinas 4', 50', 51', 60'; Messaris 10', 15'	Report	Peshev 56'

Leoforos Alexandras Stadium, Athens, Greece
Attendance: 15,000
Referee: Jovan Ružić (Yugoslavia)

15 March 1931
15:00 (+1:00)

Yugoslavia	4–1	Greece
Hitrec 35'; Tomašević 38', 75', 83'	Report	Migiakis 52'

Beogradski SK Stadium, Belgrade, Yugoslavia
Attendance: 8,000
Referee: Costel Rădulescu (Romania)

19 April 1931
16:15 (+1:00)

Yugoslavia	1–0	Bulgaria
Marjanović 21'	Report

Beogradski SK Stadium, Belgrade, Yugoslavia
Attendance: 10,000
Referee: Denis Xifando (Romania)

10 May 1931
17:00 (+1:44)

Romania	5–2	Bulgaria
Sepi 25'; Bodola 50', 66'; Stanciu 68', 81'	Report	Lozanov 51'; Panchev 89'

Stadionul ONEF, Bucuresti, Romania
Attendance: 12,000
Referee: Ernest Fabris (Yugoslavia)

28 June 1931
17:45 (+1:00)

Yugoslavia	2–4	Romania
Zečević 36'; Marjanović 60'	Report	Glanzmann 16'; Bodola 49', 89'; Kovács 50'

Stadion Maksimir, Zagreb, Yugoslavia
Attendance: 6,000
Referee: Apostolos Nikolaidis (Greece)

25 October 1931
15:30 (+2:00)

Bulgaria	2–1	Greece
Peshev 20'; Angelov 83'	Report	Kitsos 10'

Yunak Stadium, Sofia, Bulgaria
Attendance: 10,000
Referee: Jovan Ružić (Yugoslavia)

29 November 1931
15:00 (+2:00)

Greece	2–4	Romania
Angelakis 34', 39'	Report	Bodola 13', 18', 84'; Sepi 51'

Leoforos Alexandras Stadium, Athens, Greece
Attendance: 12,000
Referee: Ernest Fabris (Yugoslavia)

== Winner ==
1929–31 Balkan Cup

Romania
First title

== Statistics ==
=== Goalscorers ===
There were 61 goals scored in 12 matches, for an average of 5.08 goals per match.

7 goals

- (Romania) Iuliu Bodola
- (Romania) Rudolf Wetzer

4 goals

- (Greece) Antonis Tsolinas
- (Kingdom of Yugoslavia) Blagoje Marjanović

3 goals

- (Kingdom of Yugoslavia) Aleksandar Tomašević
- (Romania) Grațian Sepi
- (Bulgaria) Asen Peshev

2 goals

- (Bulgaria) Nikola Staykov
- (Bulgaria) Velcho Stoyanov
- (Greece) Angelos Messaris
- (Greece) Nikolaos Angelakis
- (Romania) Constantin Stanciu

1 goal

- (Bulgaria) Ljubomir Angelov
- (Bulgaria) Mihail Lozanov
- (Bulgaria) Asen Panchev
- (Greece) Antonis Migiakis
- (Greece) Dinos Andrianopulos
- (Greece) Giorgos Andrianopulos
- (Greece) Nikos Kitsos
- (Greece) Vassilis Andrianopoulos
- (Kingdom of Yugoslavia) Boris Praunsberger
- (Kingdom of Yugoslavia) Dobrivoje Zečević
- (Kingdom of Yugoslavia) Đorđe Vujadinović
- (Kingdom of Yugoslavia) Leo Lemešić
- (Kingdom of Yugoslavia) Ivan Hitrec
- (Romania) Andrei Glanzmann
- (Romania) Emerich Vogl
- (Romania) Gheorghe Ciolac
- (Romania) Ladislau Raffinsky
- (Romania) Nicolae Kovács
- (Romania) Ștefan Dobay

1 own goal

- (Bulgaria) Ljuben Gikov (against Romania)
