= Asen Panchev =

Bulgarian footballer

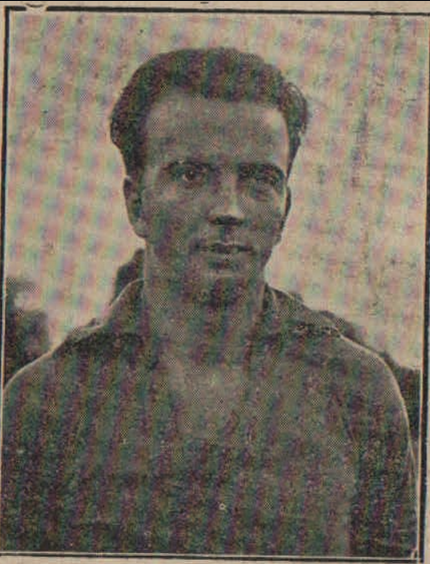

Personal information
- Date of birth: 1 October 1906
- Place of birth: Sofia, Bulgaria
- Date of death: 17 December 1989 (aged 83)
- Position: Left wing

Youth career
- Asparuh Sofia
- Levski Sofia

Senior career*
Years	Team	Apps	(Gls)
1921–1934	Levski Sofia	107	(60)
1934–1935	Bohemians Praha		
1935–1936	Levski Sofia		

International career
1926–1936	Bulgaria	39	(17)
- * Club domestic league appearances and goals

Asen Panchev (Bulgarian: Асен Панчев) (1 October 1906 – 17 December 1989) was a Bulgarian footballer who played as a left wing.

== Early life ==
He was born in Sofia, Bulgaria. He started his career in the local club Asparuh Sofia. Later moved to the youth club of Levski Sofia.

== Club career ==
In Levski he stayed thirteen seasons, played in 107 games and scored a total of sixty goals. He played one season (1934–1935) for Bohemians Praha. After the end of the season, he returned to Levski, where he spent one more year before being forced to retire.

== International career ==
In his stay in the national team of Bulgaria during the period 1926–1936 he took part in thirty-nine games, scoring seventeen goals. He and Asen Peshev worked as a pair. He has been compared to a flying arrow. His nickname was "Pancheto". On 9 June 1932, he managed to score a second-half hat-trick for Bulgaria against the powerful France, unfortunately, they went down only as consolation goals as they still lost 3–5. But the highlight of his international career came in the 1931 Balkan Cup, where he was the top goal scorer with 3 goals, having scored a brace against Turkey and a late winner against Yugoslavia that gave the title to his nation, and with it, Bulgaria's first piece of silverware. He was also part of the Bulgaria team that won the 1932 Balkan Cup, contributing with 2 goals. He also scored twice in the 1934–35 and 1936 editions, although his efforts proved useless to help Bulgaria win another Balkan Cup title. With 10 goals in the Balkan Cup, he is the shared third all-time top goal scorer in the competition's history. At the end of 1936 he was crippled and permanently became invalid.

== Managerial career ==
He coached Levski in 1939–1940 when the team won the silver medals. In 1941–1942 he won the championship and cup with Levski Sofia. For a short period of time coaches Levski in 1952.

=== International goals ===
Bulgaria score listed first, score column indicates score after each Panchev goal.

List of international goals scored by Asen Panchev
No.	Date	Venue	Opponent	Score	Result	Competition
1	10 May 1931	Stadionul ONEF, Bucuresti, Romania	Romania	5–2	5–2	1929–31 Balkan Cup
2	30 September 1931	Yunak Stadium, Sofia, Bulgaria	Turkey	2–1	5–1	1931 Balkan Cup
3	30 September 1931	Yunak Stadium, Sofia, Bulgaria	Turkey	4–1	5–1	1931 Balkan Cup
4	4 October 1931	Yunak Stadium, Sofia, Bulgaria	Yugoslavia	3–2	3–2	1931 Balkan Cup
5	27 March 1932	Leoforos Alexandras Stadium, Athens, Greece	Greece	1–1	2–1	Friendly
6	30 March 1932	Leoforos Alexandras Stadium, Athens, Greece	Greece	1–0	2–2	Friendly
7	24 April 1932	Yunak Stadium, Sofia, Bulgaria	Hungary	1–0	1–1	Friendly
8	9 June 1932	Yunak Stadium, Sofia, Bulgaria	France	1–5	1–5	Friendly
9	9 June 1932	Yunak Stadium, Sofia, Bulgaria	France	2–5	1–5	Friendly
10	9 June 1932	Yunak Stadium, Sofia, Bulgaria	France	3–5	1–5	Friendly
11	26 June 1932	Beogradski SK Stadium, Belgrade, Yugoslavia	Romania	2–0	2–0	1932 Balkan Cup
12	30 June 1932	Beogradski SK Stadium, Belgrade, Yugoslavia	Yugoslavia	2–0	3–2	1932 Balkan Cup
13	25 December 1934	Leoforos Alexandras Stadium, Athens, Greece	Yugoslavia	4–3	4–3	1934–35 Balkan Cup
14	1 January 1935	Leoforos Alexandras Stadium, Athens, Greece	Greece	2–1	2–1	1934–35 Balkan Cup
15	21 May 1936	Stadionul ONEF, Bucuresti, Romania	Greece	1–1	5–4	1936 Balkan Cup
16	21 May 1936	Stadionul ONEF, Bucuresti, Romania	Greece	5–2	5–4	1936 Balkan Cup
17	12 July 1936	Beogradski SK Stadium, Belgrade, Yugoslavia	Yugoslavia	1–1	1–3	Friendly

== Awards ==
=== Player ===
Levski Sofia

- Bulgarian champion: 1933 and 1937
- Four times winner of Ulpia Serdika Cup: 1926, 1930, 1931, 1932
- Sofia Championship: 1924, 1925, 1929, 1933, 1937

=== International ===
Bulgaria

- Balkan Cup winner in 1931 and 1932

=== Individual ===
- Top goalscorer of the 1931 Balkan Cup with 3 goals

=== Coach ===
Levski Sofia

- Bulgarian Cup and Bulgarian League winner in 1942
- Sofia Championship title holder in 1942 (part of a Treble winning season) and in 1943
