= Lyubomir Angelov =

Bulgarian footballer

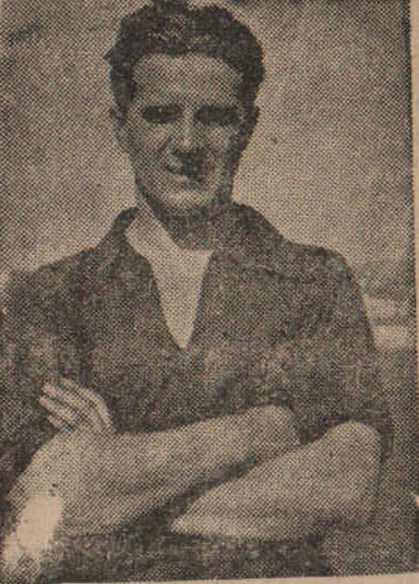
- Lyubomir Angelov in 1943

Personal information
- Date of birth: 4 October 1912
- Place of birth: Sofia, Kingdom of Bulgaria
- Date of death: 24 December 1984 (aged 72)
- Place of death: Sofia, PR Bulgaria
- Position: Forward

Youth career
- 1922–1923: Atletik Sofia
- 1923–1924: Slava
- 1924–1926: Shipka Sofia
- 1926–1928: Shipka Sofia

Senior career*
Years	Team	Apps	(Gls)
1928–1944	AS-23 Sofia		
1944–1947	Chavdar Sofia	20	(9)

International career
1931–1940	Bulgaria	44	(26)

Managerial career
- 1948: Bulgaria
- 1949–1959: Bulgaria B
- 1949–1956: Spartak Sofia
- 1950: Bulgaria
- 1953: Bulgaria
- 1957: Lokomotiv Sofia
- 1960–1962: Bulgaria U21
- 1964: Lokomotiv Sofia
- 1966–1968: Spartak Sofia
- 1969–1972: Levski-Spartak Sofia (assistant)
- * Club domestic league appearances and goals

Lyubomir Angelov (Bulgarian: Любомир Ангелов; 4 October 1912 – 24 October 1984) was a Bulgarian footballer and manager who played as a forward for the Bulgaria national team. With 26 goals in 44 caps for Bulgaria, he ranks as the nation's fifth-highest all-time top goalscorer.

== Club career ==
He began to play football in his hometown clubs in Sofia such as Atletik, Sława and Szypce. At the age of 14, he moved to AS-23 Sofia, where he was nicknamed Старото (Bulgarian: Staroto), which he received from his schoolmates from the gymnasium. He was Champion of Bulgaria in 1931, when on the final matchday, they defeated FK Szypczenski Sokol by walkover. In 1941, he won the Tsar's Cup, scoring twice in the final against Napredak Ruse to help his side to a 4–2.

After the seizure of power by the communist regime in the 1944 Bulgarian coup d'état, AS-23 Sofia was dissolved, while the main activists were subjected to repression for political reasons. Angelov, along with other leading AS-23 players, Spartak Podujane and Szypki Sofia, founded the band Czawdar Sofia, in which he performed until the end of 1947.

== International career ==
He played in 44 matches for the Bulgaria national football team from 1931 to 1940, nine of which as its captain, scoring a then-national record of 26 goals. He was part of the Bulgaria team that won two back-to-back Balkan Cups in 1931 and in 1932, contributing with 1 and 2 goals respectively, but the highlight of his international career came in the 1935 Balkan Cup, where he was the top goal scorer with 6 goals which came in the form of two hat-tricks against Greece and Yugoslavia. With 14 goals in the Balkan Cup, he is the second-best top goal scorer in the competition's history, only behind Iuliu Bodola of Romania, who has 15. Angelov was also part of Bulgaria's team for their qualification matches for the 1938 FIFA World Cup.

== Managerial career ==
After completing his competitive career, he became a coach, graduating from the State Coaching School (1948). Angelov took charge of the Bulgaria national team three times, first in 1948, then in 1950, and finally in 1953, leading the nation in 8 games. He also served as the head coach of the Bulgaria B team in 23 games between 1949 and 1959 and the youth (junior) team in 13 games between 1960 and 1962.

He was the coach of Spartak Sofia twice (1949–1956, 1966–1968) and again twice with Łokomotiv Sofia (1957, 1964), and was also employed in the training staff of Spartak-Levski Sofia, where he was assistant to Rudolf Vytlačil and Yoncho Arsov. Between 1964 and 1966, he worked in Syria, creating the structures of the local football league and the player training system.

== International goals ==
Bulgaria score listed first, score column indicates score after each Angelov goal.

List of international goals scored by Ljubomir Angelov
No.	Date	Venue	Opponent	Score	Result	Competition
1	4 October 1931	Yunak Stadium, Sofia, Bulgaria	Yugoslavia	2–2	3–2	1931 Balkan Cup
2	25 October 1931	Yunak Stadium, Sofia, Bulgaria	Greece	2–1	2–1	1929-31 Balkan Cup
3	27 March 1932	Leoforos Alexandras Stadium, Athens, Greece	Greece	2–1	2–1	Friendly
4	30 March 1932	Leoforos Alexandras Stadium, Athens, Greece	Greece	2–2	2–2	Friendly
5	30 June 1932	Beogradski SK Stadium, Belgrade, Yugoslavia	Yugoslavia	1–0	3–2	1932 Balkan Cup
6	2 July 1932	Beogradski SK Stadium, Belgrade, Yugoslavia	Greece	1–0	2–0	1932 Balkan Cup
7	4 November 1932	Taksim Stadium, Istanbul, Turkey	Turkey	3–2	3–2	Friendly
8	18 March 1934	Stadion Balgarska Armia, Sofia, Bulgaria	Yugoslavia	1–2	1–2	Friendly
9	1 April 1934	Beogradski SK Stadium, Belgrade, Yugoslavia	Yugoslavia	1–0	3–2	Friendly
10	30 December 1934	Leoforos Alexandras Stadium, Athens, Greece	Romania	1–3	2–3	1934–35 Balkan Cup
11	30 December 1934	Leoforos Alexandras Stadium, Athens, Greece	Romania	2–3	2–3	1934–35 Balkan Cup
12	26 May 1935	Stadion Balgarska Armia, Sofia, Bulgaria	Germany B	2–0	2–0	Friendly
13	16 June 1935	Yunak Stadium, Sofia, Bulgaria	Greece	2–1	5–2	1935 Balkan Cup
14	16 June 1935	Yunak Stadium, Sofia, Bulgaria	Greece	3–1	5–2	1935 Balkan Cup
15	16 June 1935	Yunak Stadium, Sofia, Bulgaria	Greece	4–1	5–2	1935 Balkan Cup
16	24 June 1935	Yunak Stadium, Sofia, Bulgaria	Yugoslavia	1–2	3–3	1935 Balkan Cup
17	24 June 1935	Yunak Stadium, Sofia, Bulgaria	Yugoslavia	2–2	3–3	1935 Balkan Cup
18	24 June 1935	Yunak Stadium, Sofia, Bulgaria	Yugoslavia	3–2	3–3	1935 Balkan Cup
19	21 May 1936	Stadionul ONEF, Bucharest, Romania	Greece	3–1	5–4	1936 Balkan Cup
20	24 May 1936	Stadionul ONEF, Bucharest, Romania	Romania	1–1	1–4	1936 Balkan Cup
21	11 July 1937	Yunak Stadium, Sofia, Bulgaria	Yugoslavia B	1–0	4–0	Friendly
22	11 July 1937	Yunak Stadium, Sofia, Bulgaria	Yugoslavia B	4–0	4–0	Friendly
23	12 September 1937	Yunak Stadium, Sofia, Bulgaria	Poland	2–1	3–3	Friendly
24	2 October 1938	Yunak Stadium, Sofia, Bulgaria	Germany B	1–1	1–3	Friendly
25	24 May 1939	Yunak Stadium, Sofia, Bulgaria	Latvia	2–0	3–0	Friendly
26	20 October 1940	Grünwalder Stadion, Munich, Germany	Germany	3–6	3–7	Friendly

== Honours ==
=== Club ===
AS-23 Sofia

Bulgarian State Football Championship:

- Champions (1): 1931

=== International ===
Bulgaria

Balkan Cup:

- Champions (2): 1931 and 1932
- Runners-up (2): 1935 and 1936

=== Individual ===
- Top goalscorer of the 1935 Balkan Cup with 6 goals
