= Leonidas Andrianopoulos =

Greek footballer (1911–2011)

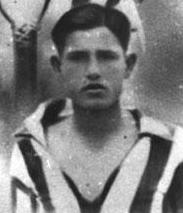
- Andrianopoulos in 1927

Personal information
- Date of birth: 10 August 1911
- Place of birth: Piraeus, Kingdom of Greece
- Date of death: 25 October 2011 (aged 100)
- Place of death: Greece
- Position: Forward

Senior career*
Years	Team	Apps	(Gls)
1927–1936	Olympiacos		

International career
1929–1935	Greece	11	(2)
- * Club domestic league appearances and goals

Leonidas Andrianopoulos (Greek: Λεωνίδας Ανδριανόπουλος; 10 August 1911 – 25 October 2011) was a Greek footballer who played as a forward.

== Career ==
Andrianopoulos played club football for Olympiacos, alongside his four older brothers Yiannis, Dinos, Giorgos and Vassilis. Following his death, club president Evangelos Marinakis described him as a "legend."

He also earned eleven international caps for Greece, scoring two goals.

== Death ==
Andrianopoulos died on 25 October 2011, at the age of 100.
