= György Bodola =

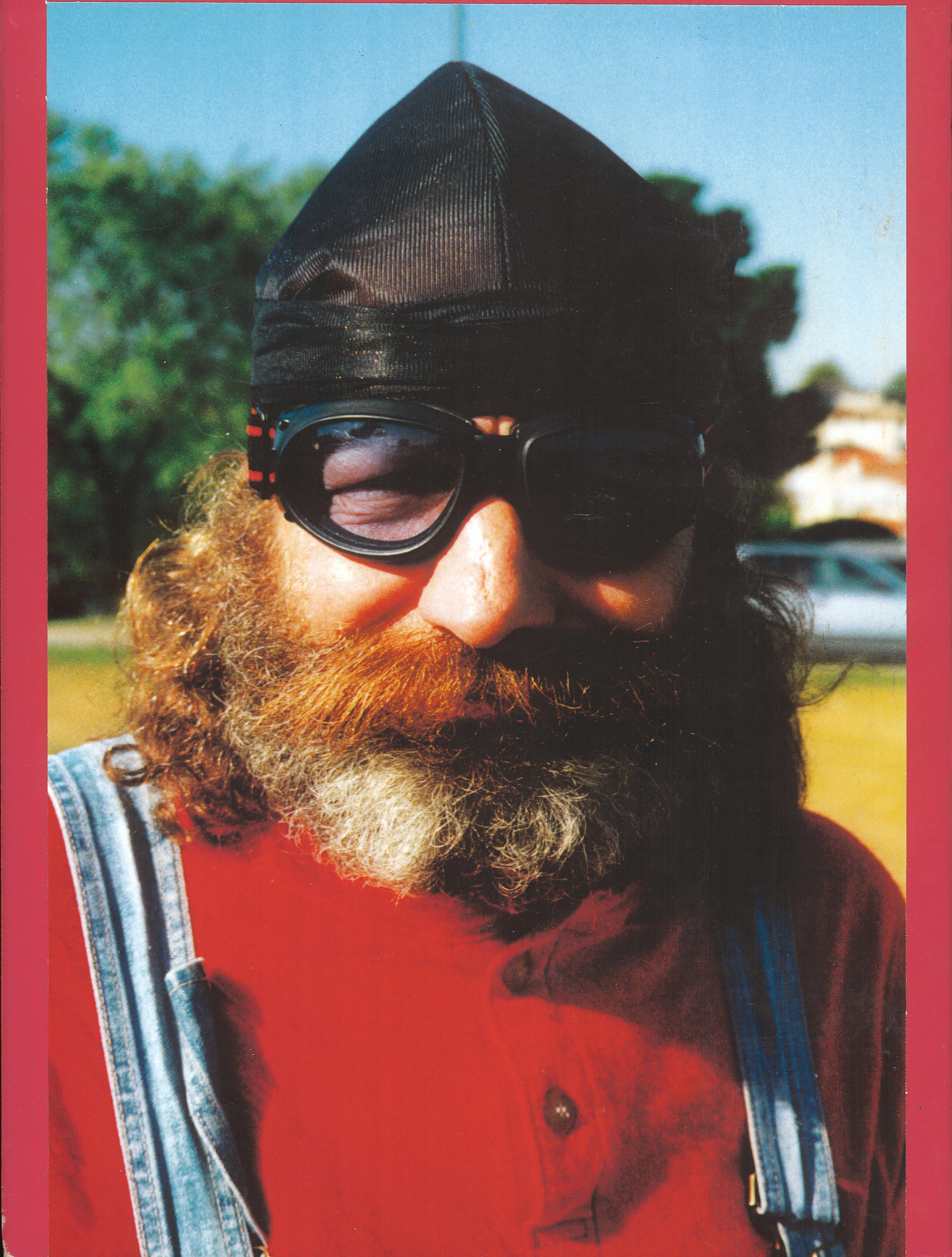
Bodola György Vancouver, 2000.

George Bodola (in Hungarian: Bodola György; died 17 March 2007) was a Hungarian illustrator.

Born in Szombathely, Hungary, his father was a soccer coach at that time. The family moved in 1958 to Pécs, in 1960 to Miskolc, and in 1962 to Budapest.

George Bodola visited from 1966 to 1968 the Fáy András School in Mester Street, as a toolmaker student. From 1969 to 1970 he was student in the High School of Ormosbánya. He visited from 1972 the evening course of Kaffka Margit Secondary School, then he went to the correspondence course, but he had not passed the matriculation exam.

He was called up for military service in 1973, but due to a brawl, he was sent by the military court to the military jail, for eight months.

== Marriages and children ==
In 1974 he married Margit Lakatos, their first child (Barnabás Hercules) was born in 1974. He divorced in 1975, but he lived together with his ex-wife until 1981. In 1982 he married Bíró Klára. Their son, Peter Archibald was born in 1983. In 1983 he defected to Italy - through Yugoslavia - with his friend, Gábor Mitribusz. Two weeks later - after a detour in France - they returned home. In 1986 Bodola emigrated again. He lived one year in Essen, where he worked as a musical instrument restorer. He returned to Hungary in 1987. In 1988 he divorced second time. In the same year he married Zsuzsanna Udvardy, and they moved in 1989 to Vancouver. He visited home in 2003, but because of a payment default he got a criminal proceeding, so he had to left the country soon.

== Later life ==
Graphic works were not able to make him a living, so he worked at the grocery market, at the Palatinus spa, as a painter, and as a cleaner.

He died in Vancouver. His ashes was scattered from a suspension bridge into a stream which runs to the Pacific Ocean.

== Art work ==
He began to draw and make pictures already in his childhood.

Did not benefit from arts education, but he was an autodidact, and soon showed his talent.

At the age of Primary school he has been issued drawings in the Hungarian Central Army Club, with great success.

With his illustrations appeared the Rock lexicon in 1980, and in 1982 (edited by Peter Tardos) "Anecdotes from the past until today's", in 1986, (edited by Czippán György and Csontos Tibor) while Cicanapló in 2004 (by Hegedős Györgyi)

He created album art (Stars on 33], Fonográf, Tolcsvay), rock music posters (Piramis, Mini, P. Mobil) and Musicians caricatures.

His works were included in the exhibition „Curved mirror”.

Hungarian, Polish, Czech and Slovak artists took part in it (2005 in Prague, then 2006 in Nagykapos, Slovakia.)

Many articles were published about his drawings and caricatures both in Hungary and Canada.

== Remembrance ==
In 2008 was held a retrospective exhibition of his works in the House of Culture „Budavár” with the participation Török Ádám & the Mini.

In the same place was held the presentation of the book „Bodoland” (George Bodola's life and art by Mezey András) in 2009.
