= Aleksandar Tomašević =

Serbian footballer and manager

Personal information
- Date of birth: 19 November 1908
- Place of birth: Belgrade, Kingdom of Serbia
- Date of death: 21 February 1988 (aged 79)
- Place of death: Belgrade, SFR Yugoslavia
- Positions: Forward; left midfielder

Senior career*
Years	Team	Apps	(Gls)
1925–1928	Jedinstvo Beograd		
1931–1939	BASK	81	(48)

International career
1931–1938	Kingdom of Yugoslavia	12	(8)

Managerial career
- Željezničar Sarajevo
- Krim Ljubljana
- 1948–1950: Red Star Belgrade
- Odred Ljubljana
- 1953: Sarajevo
- 1954–1955: Hajduk Split
- 1955–1956: Partizan
- 1957–1958: Sarajevo
- Radnički Beograd
- 1960–1961: Iraklis
- 1963–1964: Vardar
- * Club domestic league appearances and goals

Aleksandar Tomašević (Serbian Cyrillic: Александар Томашевић; 19 November 1908 – 21 February 1988) was a Yugoslav football player and manager.

== Playing career ==
Tomašević was a forward in the Belgrade Clubs before World War II, a player of BASK, and a manager. He started playing in 1925 in SK Jedinstvo Beograd. In 1928, he moved to SK Soko and a year later the club was renamed as BASK where he would stay for eleven years, until 1940, when because of a serious lesion of the meniscus, Tomašević had to stop playing.

== International career ==
Beside 23 matches for the Belgrade City selection, and one match for the Yugoslav B team, Tomašević played 12 matches for the Yugoslavia national football team having scored 8 goals. He mostly played as a striker or left midfielder. His debut was in Belgrade on 15 March 1931 against Greece (4-1 win) having scored a hat-trick. There was a darker period in his national team career that happened after in a match for the Balkan Cup, in Sofia against Bulgaria (2–3 loss), he failed to materialize a penalty and was afterward absent from the national side for three years! His comeback was in a Balkan Cup realized in Athens in 1935 and was a perfect opportunity for him to demonstrate the unfairness of his absence, having shown great condition and scored three goals in two matches that much helped his side to win the tournament, whereas Tomašević himself was the best scorer (along with Tirnanić with 3 goals each). His last match was on 22 May 1938 in a friendly match against Italy in Genoa (0–4 loss).

== Managerial career ==
After his injury, Tomašević continued to be attached to football getting significant results as a football manager. He was the main coach of Sarajevo's FK Željezničar, Ljubljana's clubs Krim and Odred, Vardar Skopje and Partizan Belgrade but his main achievements were the two national cups with Red Star Belgrade, one national championship with Hajduk Split and winning the promotion to the First League with Radnički Beograd. He also spend some time coaching in Greece.

== Honours ==
=== Player ===
Yugoslavia

- Balkan Cup: 1934–35

=== Manager ===
Hajduk Split

- Yugoslav First League: 1954–55

Red Star Belgrade

- Yugoslav Cup: 1948–49, 1949–50
