= Sándor Schwartz =

Romanian footballer (1909–1994)

Personal information
- Date of birth: 18 January 1909
- Place of birth: Marosvásárhely, Austria-Hungary (now Târgu Mureș, Romania)
- Date of death: 1994 (aged 84–85)
- Height: 1.78 m (5 ft 10 in)
- Position: Forward

Youth career
- 1925–1926: Unirea Alba Iulia
- 1926–1928: SG Arad

Senior career*
Years	Team	Apps	(Gls)
1928	AMEF Arad		
1928–1930	Szegedi AK	52	(18)
1930–1939	Ripensia Timișoara	102	(54)
1939–1940	Minerul Lupeni		
Total		154	(72)

International career
1932–1937	Romania	10	(8)
- * Club domestic league appearances and goals

Sándor Schwartz (Romanian: Alexandru Schwartz, 18 January 1909 – 1994) was a Romanian footballer who played as a forward. He participated in the 1934 FIFA World Cup for the Romania national team.

Schwartz joined Ripensia Timişoara in 1930, and played for the club until the outbreak of World War II. He also made 10 appearances for Romania.

== Honours ==
Ripensia Timișoara

- Divizia A: 1932–33, 1934–35, 1935–36, 1937–38
- Cupa României: 1933–34, 1935–36
