= Iuliu Bodola =

Romanian-Hungarian footballer (1912–1993)

Iuliu Bodola / Gyula Bodola
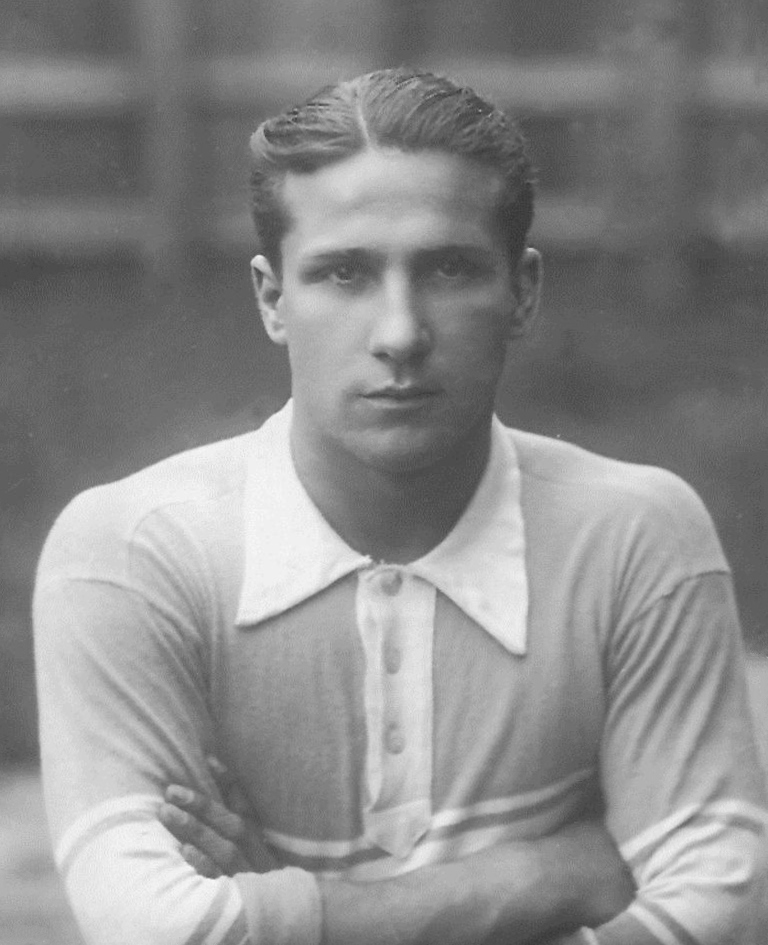

Personal information
- Date of birth: 26 February 1912
- Place of birth: Brassó, Austria-Hungary (today Brașov, Romania)
- Date of death: 9 September 1992 (aged 80)
- Place of death: Budapest, Hungary
- Height: 1.77 m (5 ft 10 in)
- Position: Striker

Youth career
- 1922–1929: Brașovia Brașov

Senior career*
| Years | Team | Apps | (Gls) |
| 1929–1931 | CA Oradea | 17 | (6) |
| 1931–1932 | IAR Brașov | | |
| 1932–1937 | CA Oradea | 89 | (62) |
| 1937–1940 | Venus București | 61 | (47) |
| 1940–1944 | Nagyváradi AC (Note: The statistics for the 1940–41 Nemzeti Bajnokság II season are unavailable.) | 103 | (69) |
| 1944 | Vasas | 4 | (0) |
| 1945–1946 | Ferar Cluj | 3 | (3) |
| 1946–1949 | MTK Hungária | 85 | (37) |
| Total | | 362 | (224) |

International career
| 1931–1939 | Romania | 48 | (31) |
| 1940–1948 | Hungary | 13 | (4) |

Managerial career
- 1946: Ferar Cluj
- 1949–1950: MTK Budapest (youth)
- 1950–1951: Szolnoki MÁV
- 1951–1953: Szombathelyi Haladás
- 1953–1954: Pécsi Lokomotív
- 1954–1957: Komlói Bányász SK
- 1957–1959: Pécsi VS
- 1959–1960: Gyulai SE
- 1960–1961: Diósgyőri VTK
- 1963: Salgótarjáni BTC
- 1964–1971: Ormosbányai Bányász
- * Club domestic league appearances and goals

Iuliu Bodola (Hungarian: Bodola Gyula; 26 February 1912 – 9 September 1992) was a Romanian-Hungarian footballer who played as a striker. He represented both Romania and Hungary internationally. He is Romania's third all-time top scorer, and he is also the all-time top scorer of the Balkan Cup.

== Club career ==
"For me, the greatest Romanian footballer of all time was Iuliu Bodola. Neither Nicolae Dobrin nor Gheorghe Hagi could be compared with him."

— Former Romania coach Angelo Niculescu

=== Early career ===
Bodola, nicknamed Duduș, was born on 26 February 1912 in Brassó, Austria-Hungary (today Brașov, Romania). He began playing junior-level football in 1922 at his hometown club Brașovia. In 1929, he started to play at senior level for CA Oradea in the regional championship. He moved to IAR Brașov in 1931, only to return one year later to CA Oradea. Bodola made his Divizia A debut on 11 September 1932 in a 3–0 home win over Brașovia.

=== Venus București ===
In 1937, Bodola was transferred from CA Oradea to Venus București for a one million Romanian lei fee. He played in both legs of the 10–5 aggregate loss to Újpest in the first round of the 1937 Mitropa Cup. During his three-season spell with Venus, Bodola helped the club win two consecutive titles under coach Béla Jánosy in the 1938–39 and 1939–40 seasons, and he was the team's top-scorer with 12 and 17 goals respectively. He also played in a 1–0 win over AGC Bologna in the 1939 Mitropa Cup quarter-finals, but they did not qualify further because the second leg was lost 5–0. Bodola played in the first two matches of the 1940 Cupa României final, when, after two draws in two replays of the final (in the first replay, which ended 4–4, Bodola scored one goal) Rapid București won the third replay and the trophy.

=== Nagyváradi AC and Vasas ===
When Northern Transylvania became part of the Kingdom of Hungary in August 1940, Bodola chose to play for CA Oradea, which was renamed Nagyváradi AC, in the Hungarian league. He helped them achieve promotion to the first league at the end of the 1940–41 Nemzeti Bajnokság II season. Subsequently, he made his Nemzeti Bajnokság I debut on 20 August 1941 under coach Ferenc Rónay in a 5–2 home win over Újvidéki AC. He scored his first goal in the competition on 31 August in a 1–1 draw against Szolnoki. Bodola netted 15 goals until the end of the season, including three hat-tricks in three victories against MÁVAG, Kolozsvár AC and Kispest AC. During the 1942–43 season, he scored 17 goals, which included four in an 8–2 win over title holders and eventual champions Csepel SC. Thanks to these performances, Bodola was named the best player of the season and the 1942 Hungarian footballer of the year. He started the 1943–44 season strongly by scoring three goals in the first two matches which were wins over Szolnoki and Kolozsvár AC. Until the end of the season, he netted 15 goals, including seven in the last five rounds, which helped Nagyváradi AC win the championship under coach Rónay and made him the team's second top-scorer behind Francisc Spielmann, who scored 23. In 1944, Bodola had a short stint at Vasas.

=== Ferar Cluj and MTK Hungária ===
After the end of World War II, Bodola returned to Romania and played from 1945 to 1946 for Ferar Cluj, while briefly also serving as the team's head coach for a few matches. He made his last Divizia A appearance on 23 September 1946 in a 1–0 away loss to Carmen București, totaling 153 matches with 112 goals in the competition. Afterwards, Bodola went to play for MTK Hungária, which paid Ferar a 15 million Romanian lei transfer fee. He made his first league appearance for his new club on 17 November under coach Pál Titkos in a 1–0 away win over Szolnoki, and he scored his first goal on 9 March 1947 in a 2–2 draw against Vasas. On 28 February 1948, he scored a hat-trick in a 6–1 victory against Salgótarjáni BTC. Two weeks later, he scored eight goals in a 16–0 win over MOGÜRT, but the result was later annulled because MOGÜRT withdrew from the championship. Bodola made his last Nemzeti Bajnokság I appearance on 4 December 1949 in a 2–2 draw against Csepel SC, accumulating a total of 182 games with 86 goals in the competition.

== International career ==
=== Romania ===
Bodola made his debut for Romania on 10 May 1931 under coach Constantin Rădulescu, scoring two goals in a 5–2 win over Bulgaria in the 1929–31 Balkan Cup. During that Balkan Cup edition, he netted another double and then a hat-trick in victories against Yugoslavia and Greece to help his side win the competition and become its top-scorer with seven goals alongside teammate Rudolf Wetzer. Before the match against Greece, Bodola scored another hat-trick in a 4–2 friendly win over Lithuania. He played in three victories against Bulgaria, Greece and Yugoslavia, netting a brace against the latter in the conquest of the 1933 Balkan Cup. Bodola played four matches and scored once in a 4–1 victory against Austria during the 1931–1934 Central European Cup for Amateurs which was another tournament won by Romania.

Bodola played in a 2–2 draw against Switzerland during the successful 1934 World Cup qualifiers. Afterwards, he was selected by coaches Rădulescu and Josef Uridil to be part of the squad that went to the final tournament in Italy, playing the entire match in the 2–1 defeat to eventual finalists, Czechoslovakia in the first round. In May 1936, Bodola netted his third hat-trick for The Tricolours in a 3–2 win over Yugoslavia in the friendly 1936 King Carol's Cup. He was also part of Romania's team that won the 1936 Balkan Cup, contributing with two goals scored in a 5–2 victory against Greece. Subsequently, he was selected by coaches Alexandru Săvulescu and Rădulescu to be part of the squad that participated in the 1938 World Cup. Bodola played in the first game against Cuba that ended in a 3–3 draw, but he did not play in the replay which ended in a surprising 2–1 loss. He made his last appearance for Romania in a 1–1 friendly draw against Hungary.

With 48 appearances and 31 goals for Romania, Bodola previously held the national records for both caps and goals. Mircea Lucescu surpassed his appearance record in 1974, and Gheorghe Hagi broke his goal record in 1997.

=== Hungary ===
When Northern Transylvania became part of the Kingdom of Hungary in August 1940, Bodola decided to play for the Hungary national team. He made his debut on 1 December 1940 under coach Dénes Ginzery, closing the scoring in a 1–1 friendly draw against Italy. On 1 November 1942, he netted a goal in a 3–0 friendly win over Switzerland, followed by a brace in May 1943 in another friendly victory against the same opponent. His last game for The Magyars was a 2–1 friendly victory against rivals Austria. Bodola earned a total of 13 caps with four goals for Hungary.

== Managerial career ==
Bodola had his first coaching experience when he served as a player-coach for a few matches during the 1946–47 season at Ferar Cluj. In 1949, he moved to Hungary, coaching the youth squad of MTK Hungária. From 1950 to 1951, he coached Szolnoki MÁV and was close to leading them to promotion at the end of the 1950 Nemzeti Bajnokság II season, but eventually they finished second, one point behind Szegedi Honvéd. Subsequently, in 1951 Bodola was appointed coach of Nemzeti Bajnokság I club Szombathelyi Haladás, a position he held until 1953. He then moved to Pécsi Lokomotív and helped them finish first in their group during the 1953 Nemzeti Bajnokság II season, but they did not gain promotion to the top-tier because they lost the play-off. Afterwards, Bodola had a three-year stint with Komlói Bányász SK, where he managed to earn a promotion to the first league at the end of the 1956 season. In the following years, he worked in the lower leagues for teams such as Pécsi VS and Gyulai SE, but also had stints in the first league at Diósgyőri VTK and Salgótarjáni BTC. His last coaching experience took place from 1964 to 1971 at Ormosbányai Bányász in the Hungarian lower leagues. Bodola has a total of 115 matches as a manager in the Hungarian top-division, Nemzeti Bajnokság I.

== Style of play ==
Ilie Savu, who was a teammate of Bodola at Venus București, described Bodola's style of play as follows: "As a player, he was a force to be reckoned with. He simply wreaked havoc among his opponents. He possessed a ferocious shot. He struck the ball equally well with both feet—mercilessly and with enviable accuracy."

== Personal life ==
His son, György, was a Hungarian illustrator.

Bodola died on 9 September 1992 at age 80 in Budapest, Hungary. In November 2008, the Municipal Stadium in Oradea was renamed after him, becoming the Stadionul Iuliu Bodola. A memorial plaque in honor of him was displayed in his native Brașov in 2016.

== Career statistics ==
Appearances and goals by national team and year
| National team | Year | Apps | Goals |
|---|---|---|---|
| Romania | 1931 | 7 | 10 |
| Romania | 1932 | 7 | 4 |
| Romania | 1933 | 5 | 2 |
| Romania | 1934 | 3 | 2 |
| Romania | 1935 | 4 | 1 |
| Romania | 1936 | 4 | 5 |
| Romania | 1937 | 8 | 4 |
| Romania | 1938 | 5 | 1 |
| Romania | 1939 | 5 | 2 |
| Total | | 48 | 31 |
| Hungary | 1940 | 2 | 1 |
| Hungary | 1941 | 3 | 0 |
| Hungary | 1942 | 3 | 1 |
| Hungary | 1943 | 4 | 2 |
| Hungary | 1948 | 1 | 0 |
| Total | | 13 | 4 |

Scores and results list Romania's and Hungary's goal tally first, score column indicates score after each Bodola goal.

List of international goals scored by Iuliu Bodola
| No. | Date | Venue | Opponent | Score | Result | Competition |
Romania goals
| 1 | 10 May 1931 | Stadionul ONEF, Bucharest, Romania | Bulgaria | 2–0 | 5–2 | 1929–31 Balkan Cup |
| 2 | 10 May 1931 | Stadionul ONEF, Bucharest, Romania | Bulgaria | 3–1 | 5–2 | 1929–31 Balkan Cup |
| 3 | 28 June 1931 | Stadion Maksimir, Zagreb, Yugoslavia | Yugoslavia | 2–1 | 4–2 | 1929–31 Balkan Cup |
| 4 | 28 June 1931 | Stadion Maksimir, Zagreb, Yugoslavia | Yugoslavia | 4–2 | 4–2 | 1929–31 Balkan Cup |
| 5 | 26 August 1931 | Makabi Stadionas, Kaunas, Lithuania | Lithuania | 1–0 | 4–2 | Friendly |
| 6 | 26 August 1931 | Makabi Stadionas, Kaunas, Lithuania | Lithuania | 2–0 | 4–2 | Friendly |
| 7 | 26 August 1931 | Makabi Stadionas, Kaunas, Lithuania | Lithuania | 4–2 | 4–2 | Friendly |
| 8 | 29 November 1931 | Leoforos Alexandras Stadium, Athens, Greece | Greece | 1–0 | 4–2 | 1929–31 Balkan Cup |
| 9 | 29 November 1931 | Leoforos Alexandras Stadium, Athens, Greece | Greece | 2–0 | 4–2 | 1929–31 Balkan Cup |
| 10 | 29 November 1931 | Leoforos Alexandras Stadium, Athens, Greece | Greece | 4–2 | 4–2 | 1929–31 Balkan Cup |
| 11 | 8 May 1932 | Stadionul ONEF, Bucharest, Romania | Austria Amateurs | 3–0 | 4–1 | 1931–1934 Central European Cup for Amateurs |
| 12 | 12 June 1932 | Stadionul ONEF, Bucharest, Romania | France | 1–0 | 6–3 | Friendly |
| 13 | 12 June 1932 | Stadionul ONEF, Bucharest, Romania | France | 6–3 | 6–3 | Friendly |
| 14 | 28 June 1932 | Beogradski SK Stadium, Belgrade, Yugoslavia | Greece | 3–0 | 3–0 | 1932 Balkan Cup |
| 15 | 11 June 1933 | Stadionul ONEF, Bucharest, Romania | Yugoslavia | 3–0 | 5–0 | 1933 Balkan Cup |
| 16 | 11 June 1933 | Stadionul ONEF, Bucharest, Romania | Yugoslavia | 4–0 | 5–0 | 1933 Balkan Cup |
| 17 | 30 December 1934 | Leoforos Alexandras Stadium, Athens, Greece | Bulgaria | 1–0 | 3–2 | 1934–35 Balkan Cup |
| 18 | 30 December 1934 | Leoforos Alexandras Stadium, Athens, Greece | Bulgaria | 2–0 | 3–2 | 1934–35 Balkan Cup |
| 19 | 24 June 1935 | Levski Stadium, Sofia, Bulgaria | Greece | 1–2 | 2–2 | 1935 Balkan Cup |
| 20 | 10 May 1936 | Stadionul ONEF, Bucharest, Romania | Yugoslavia | 1–0 | 3–2 | 1936 King Carol's Cup |
| 21 | 10 May 1936 | Stadionul ONEF, Bucharest, Romania | Yugoslavia | 2–1 | 3–2 | 1936 King Carol's Cup |
| 22 | 10 May 1936 | Stadionul ONEF, Bucharest, Romania | Yugoslavia | 3–1 | 3–2 | 1936 King Carol's Cup |
| 23 | 17 May 1936 | Stadionul ONEF, Bucharest, Romania | Greece | 1–0 | 5–2 | 1936 Balkan Cup |
| 24 | 17 May 1936 | Stadionul ONEF, Bucharest, Romania | Greece | 5–2 | 5–2 | 1936 Balkan Cup |
| 25 | 18 April 1937 | Stadionul ONEF, Bucharest, Romania | Czechoslovakia | 1–0 | 1–1 | 1937–38 Eduard Benes Cup |
| 26 | 4 July 1937 | Stadion ŁKS, Łódź, Poland | Poland | 3–1 | 4–2 | Friendly |
| 27 | 8 July 1937 | Makabi Stadionas, Kaunas, Lithuania | Lithuania | 2–0 | 2–0 | Friendly |
| 28 | 14 July 1937 | Kadrioru Staadion, Tallinn, Estonia | Estonia | 1–1 | 1–2 | Friendly |
| 29 | 4 December 1938 | Stadion Letná, Prague, Czechoslovakia | Czechoslovakia | 2–0 | 2–6 | 1937–38 Eduard Benes Cup |
| 30 | 18 May 1939 | Stadionul Venus, Bucharest, Romania | Latvia | 1–0 | 4–0 | Friendly |
| 31 | 18 May 1939 | Stadionul Venus, Bucharest, Romania | Latvia | 4–0 | 4–0 | Friendly |
Hungary goals
| 1 | 1 December 1940 | Stadio Luigi Ferraris, Genoa, Italy | Italy | 1–0 | 1–1 | Friendly |
| 2 | 1 November 1942 | Üllői úti stadion, Budapest, Hungary | Switzerland | 1–0 | 3–0 | Friendly |
| 3 | 16 May 1943 | Charmilles Stadium, Geneva, Switzerland | Switzerland | 1–1 | 3–1 | Friendly |
| 4 | 16 May 1943 | Charmilles Stadium, Geneva, Switzerland | Switzerland | 3–1 | 3–1 | Friendly |

== Honours ==
=== Player ===
Venus București

- Divizia A: 1938–39, 1939–40
- Cupa României runner-up: 1939–40

Nagyváradi AC

- Nemzeti Bajnokság I: 1943–44
- Nemzeti Bajnokság II: 1940–41

Romania

- Balkan Cup: 1929–31, 1933, 1936
- Central European International Cup: 1931–34

Individual

- Balkan Cup top scorer: 1929–31 (joint with Rudolf Wetzer)
- Hungarian Footballer of the Year: 1942
- Nemzeti Bajnokság I player of the season: 1942–43

Record

- Most goals in the Balkan Cup: 15

=== Manager ===
Pécsi Lokomotív

- Nemzeti Bajnokság II: 1953

Komlói Bányász SK

- Nemzeti Bajnokság II: 1956
