= Levski Playing Field =

Former stadium in Sofia, Bulgaria

- Interactive map of Levski Playing Field
- Location: Sofia, Bulgaria

Construction
- Opened: 1934

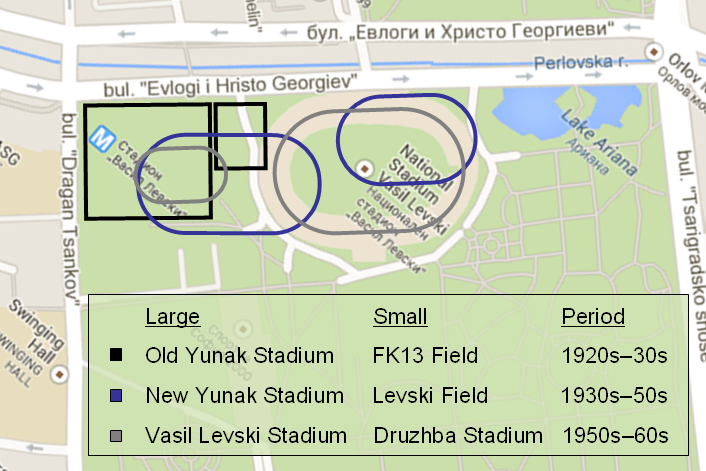
Overlay map showing the location of Levski Field in relation to the Vasil Levski Stadium, as well as other historical grounds in the Borisova Gradina.

Levski Playing Field (Bulgarian: Игрище „Левски“, romanized: Igrishte Levski) was the original stadium of Levski Sofia football club. It was commissioned in 1924 and completed in 1934. In 1944 it had a seating capacity of 10,000.

The stadium was demolished after 1949 by the authorities to make place for the Vasil Levski National Stadium.
