= Yunak Stadium =

Sports stadium in Bulgaria

Coordinates: 42.686324°N 23.332739°E

- Interactive map of Yunak Stadium
- Full name: Yunak Stadium
- Location: Sofia, Bulgaria
- Owner: Yunak Gymnastic Society
- Capacity: 35,000

Construction
- Opened: August 20, 1928
- Closed: 1952

Tenants
- Bulgaria national football team FC 13 Sofia (originally co-owners); Levski Sofia

Yunak Stadium (Bulgarian: Стадион Юнак, Stadion Yunak), was a multi-use stadium in central Sofia, Bulgaria. It was located at the north-western corner of Knyaz Boris's Garden, on the southern bank of the Perlovska river. It was the largest stadium in Bulgaria until the middle of the 20th century, with a capacity of 35,000 spectators, and was initially used as the main stadium for Bulgaria national football team matches. The pitch was almost exactly square-shaped, with four straight rows of stands on all sides.

The stadium is named after the Yunak sports societies which formed in Bulgaria in the late 19th century, themselves named after the word "yunak", meaning a strong young man.

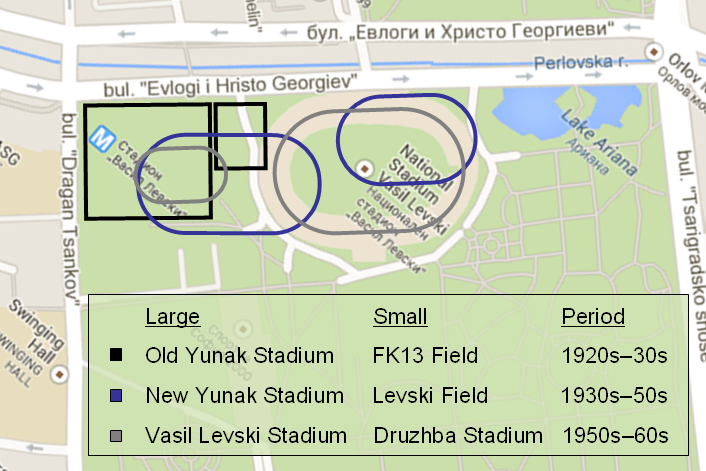
Overlay map showing the location of the Old and New Yunak stadiums, as well as other stadiums in the Borisova Gradina.

In the 1920s–30s, immediately to the northeast of Yunak stadium, was built the smaller Levski Field, the home ground of SK Levski. In the 1950s, the BCP decided to build a new, larger national stadium on the site of Levski Field. As the new stadium would infringe on the north-eastern stands of the Yunak stadium, this was also demolished in order to make way for the Vasil Levski National Stadium, opened 1953. Because of this, Dinamo Sofia were given a new home in the north-eastern suburbs of the capital, while in the place of Yunak was built the much smaller Druzhba ("Friendship") stadium, which was used for many years as an ice rink.

After the fall of communism, the disused ice rink regained the name of the original Yunak stadium, but was never again used as a sports facility and, as of the early 2000s, lies in ruins, which are visible between the national stadium and the Sofia Metro station that formerly bore the same name.

The stadium has also been used for unorthodox "sports", such as live human chess during the reign of Tsar Boris.
