= Romania national football team =

Men's association football team

Romania
- Nickname: Tricolorii (The Tricolours)
- Association: Federația Română de Fotbal (FRF)
- Confederation: UEFA (Europe)
- Head coach: Gheorghe Hagi
- Captain: Nicolae Stanciu
- Most caps: Dorinel Munteanu (134)
- Top scorer: Adrian Mutu; Gheorghe Hagi (35)
- Home stadium: Various
- FIFA code: ROU
First colours	Second colours	Third colours

FIFA ranking
- Current: 58 (18 November 2026)
- Highest: 3 (September 1997)
- Lowest: 58 (October 2026)

First international
- Kingdom of SCS 1–2 Romania (Belgrade, Kingdom of SCS; 8 June 1922)

Biggest win
- Romania 9–0 Finland (Bucharest, Romania; 14 October 1973)

Biggest defeat
- Hungary 9–0 Romania (Budapest, Hungary; 6 June 1948)

World Cup
- Appearances: 7 (first in 1930, last in 1998)
- Best result: Quarter-finals (1994)

European Championship
- Appearances: 6 (first in 1984)
- Best result: Quarter-finals (2000)
Medal record
Balkan Cup
Gold medal – first place	1929–31	Team
Gold medal – first place	1933 Romania	Team
Gold medal – first place	1936 Romania	Team
Gold medal – first place	1980 Turkey	Team
Silver medal – second place	1976 Romania	Team
Bronze medal – third place	1932 Yugoslavia	Team
Bronze medal – third place	1934–35 Greece	Team
Bronze medal – third place	1946 Albania	Team
Bronze medal – third place	1947	Team
- Website: frf.ro (in Romanian)

The Romania national football team (Romanian: Echipa națională de fotbal a României) represents Romania in men's international association football. It is controlled by the Romanian Football Federation (FRF; Federația Română de Fotbal), the governing body responsible for football in Romania. The team is commonly nicknamed the Tricolorii ("the Tricolours") and usually plays its home matches at the Arena Națională in Bucharest.

Romania has appeared at seven editions of the FIFA World Cup, and was one of only four European nations—alongside Belgium, France, and Yugoslavia—to compete at the inaugural tournament in 1930. The team qualified for all pre-World War II editions of the competition, returned in 1970, and later produced a golden generation during the 1990s that reached three consecutive World Cups from 1990 to 1998. Romania's best World Cup campaign came in 1994, when led by playmaker Gheorghe Hagi defeated Argentina 3–2 in the round of 16, before narrowly losing to Sweden on penalties in the quarter-finals.

The national team has also qualified for the UEFA European Championship six times, making its debut in 1984 and most recently competing in 2024. Its best result came at Euro 2000, where Romania advanced from a group of death containing Germany, Portugal, and England, before being eliminated by eventual runners-up Italy in the quarter-finals.

In regional competitions, Romania was the most successful side at the Balkan Cup, winning the tournament a record four times between 1929 and 1980.

== History ==
=== Early years ===
Romania playing against Peru at the 1930 FIFA World Cup in Uruguay

The Romanian Football Federation (Federația Română de Fotbal) was established in October 1909 in Bucharest. Romania played their first international match on 8 June 1922, a 2–1 win over Yugoslavia in Belgrade, being coached by Teofil Moraru. Several temporary coaches were employed, before Moraru resumed control in August 1924, managing the side for nearly four years. Romania enjoyed some success during the 1930s; manager Costel Rădulescu took them to the first three FIFA World Cup tournaments, a feat matched only by Brazil, Belgium and France.

==== World Cups in the 1930s ====
At the 1930 World Cup, Romania won their first match against Peru, 3–1, with goals from Adalbert Deșu, Constantin Stanciu, and Nicolae Kovács and Samuel Zauber as goalkeeper, before losing 4–0 by hosts and eventual winners Uruguay.

Romania qualified for the next World Cup in 1934 after beating Yugoslavia 2–1 in a repeat of their first international. At the finals, Romania played only one game in a new knock-out format, losing 2–1 to Czechoslovakia in Trieste, Italy, with Ștefan Dobay scoring their only goal of the tournament.

Romania qualified by default for the 1938 World Cup after their qualifying playoff opponents Egypt withdrew. They suffered a shock defeat in the finals in France, losing to minnows Cuba, who, like Romania, had only qualified due to the withdrawal of their qualifying opponents, the United States. The first match at the Stade du T.O.E.C. in Toulouse ended 3–3 after extra time, but Cuba won the replay four days later 2–1.

=== Angelo Niculescu era (1967-1971, 1972) ===
==== 1970 World Cup ====
Despite a 3–0 loss to Portugal in Lisbon and two draws against Greece, Romania was able to qualify for the 1970 World Cup in Mexico. Angelo Niculescu's promising side were given the toughest of draws, in Group 3 with 1966 winners England, giants Brazil and Czechoslovakia.

A Geoff Hurst goal gave England a narrow victory in Romania's first match at the Estadio Jalisco in Guadalajara in what was a very physical game. Chances were improved with a 2–1 win over the Czechs. After going behind early to a Ladislav Petráš goal, Romania turned it around after half-time with Alexandru Neagu and Florea Dumitrache scoring to give them two vital points. Even then, only a win over the Brazilians would take them into the quarter-finals.

There were rumours before the match that Brazil might prefer Romania to progress than world champions England; after beating them 1–0 in their previous match in Guadalajara, the South American giants still viewed England as one of its biggest obstacles to tournament victory. But Brazil played some of the best football of the competition, with Pelé scoring twice and a Jairzinho goal in between. Romania battled bravely; Dumitrache pulled the score back to 2–1 before the break and a late Emerich Dembrowski goal made it 3–2, but they were out.

=== 1972 to 1978 ===
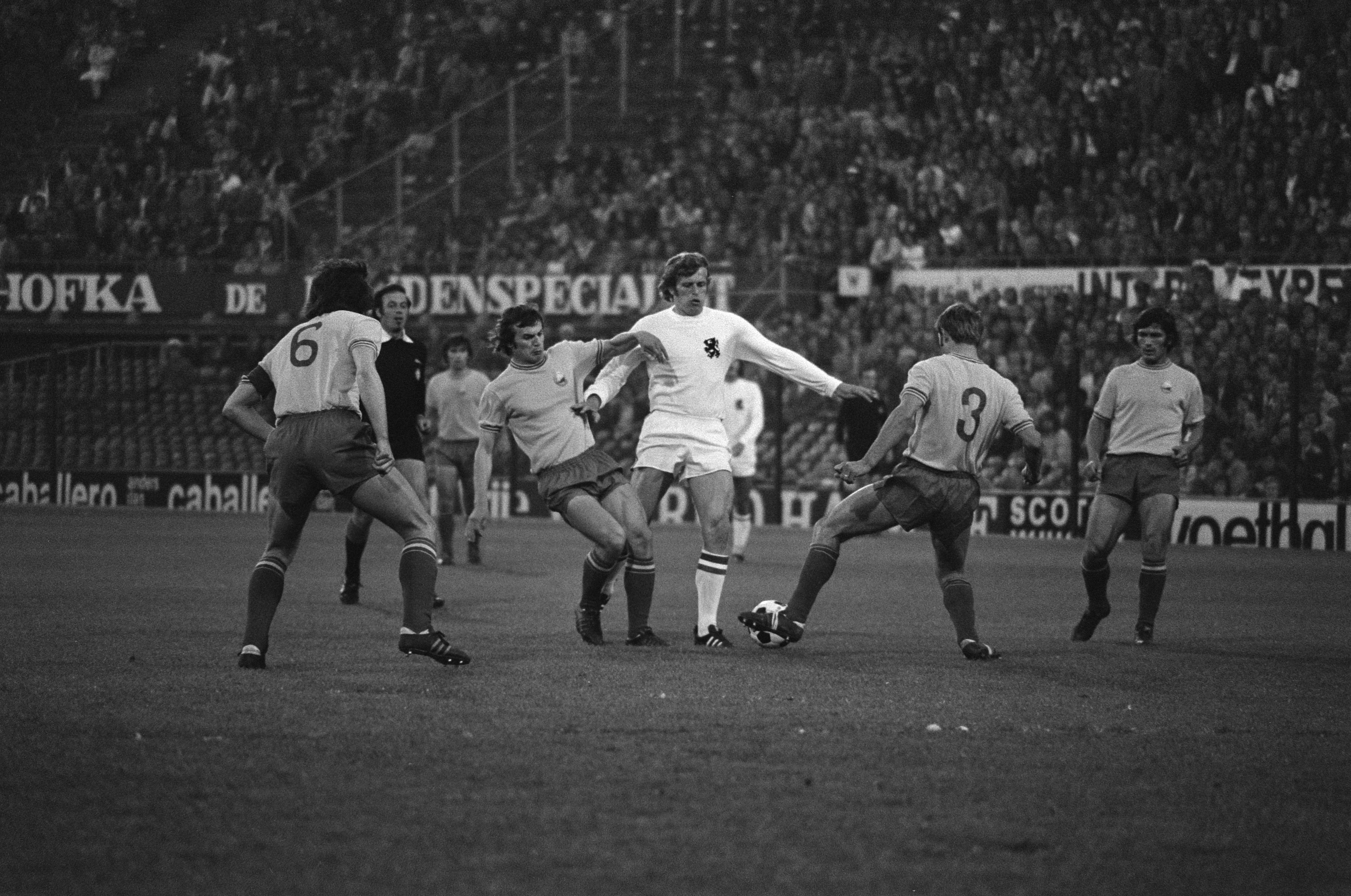
Romania and the Netherlands drawing goalless at De Kuip, 1974

On 26 September 1972, under new coach Valentin Stanescu, Romania suffered a significant defeat to East Germany in Leipzig. The East Germans won 2–0 to effectively seal their first ever qualification for the World Cup, which would be held over the border in West Germany. With East Germany scoring a predictable 4–1 win in Albania, Romania were out, despite a huge 9–0 win over Finland in Bucharest.

Romania continued to suffer poor form in the UEFA European Championship. In their qualifying group for the 1976 European Football Championship, they were out-qualified by Spain despite an impressive 1–1 draw in the away match. Romania failed to win matches, drawing twice with Scotland and Spain and dropping points in Denmark with a dismal goalless draw.

Romania were again beaten by Spain for a place in the 1978 World Cup in Argentina. After a 1–0 win in Bucharest, Romania lost a match at home to Yugoslavia 6–4 having led 3–2 at half time. Spain won 1–0 in Belgrade to seal passage to Argentina.

=== Mircea Lucescu era (1981-1986, first spell) ===
==== 1984 European Championship ====
Romania's sole successful qualifying campaign between 1970 and 1990 was for the European Championships in 1984 in France. At the finals, Romania were drawn with Spain, holders West Germany and Portugal. Under head coach Mircea Lucescu, an encouraging opening game in Saint-Étienne saw them draw with the Spanish. Francisco José Carrasco opened the scoring from the penalty spot but Romania equalized before half-time with a goal from Laszlo Bölöni.

Against the Germans in Lens, Marcel Coraș scored an equalizer in the first minute of the second half in response to Rudi Völler's opener, but Völler would score a winning goal. Their last match in Nantes was a must-win match, but Nené's late winner meant Portugal progressed with Spain, who netted a dramatic late winner against West Germany at the Parc des Princes in Paris.

=== Emerich Jenei era (1986-1990, first spell) ===
Romania stuttered throughout the rest of the decade, but a stronger squad at the end of the decade saw them qualify for their fifth World Cup in 1990. A win over Denmark in their last match took Emerich Jenei's side to the finals for the first time in 20 years.

==== 1990 World Cup ====
With an increasing trend for big clubs in Italy and Spain buying up the best foreign talent, Romania's squad was entirely domestic-based. Midfielder Ilie Dumitrescu, striker Florin Răducioiu and playmaker Gheorghe Hagi, were in the squad. After world champions Argentina were stunned by Cameroon in the tournament's opening match, Romania had a convincing win over the Soviet Union at the San Nicola in Bari, with Marius Lăcătuș scoring in each half. The result was all the more impressive given the absence of Hagi. There was controversy, however, as Lăcătus' second was a penalty given for a handball by Vagiz Khidiatullin that television replays showed to be some way outside the penalty area.

Romania lost to Cameroon next; cult hero Roger Milla, aged 38, came on as a substitute for Emmanuel Maboang Kessack and scored twice before Gavril Balint pulled one back. Romania needed a point in their last match against improving Argentina at the San Paolo in Naples; Pedro Monzón gave Argentina the lead after an hour, but Balint quickly equalized and Romania held on to reach the second round.

Against Jack Charlton's Republic of Ireland side in Genoa, Romania did not have the quality to break down a defensive opposition. Daniel Timofte was the only player to miss in the penalty shoot-out – his kick saved by Packie Bonner – and Romania were out.

=== Anghel Iordănescu era (1993-1998, first spell) ===
==== 1994 World Cup ====
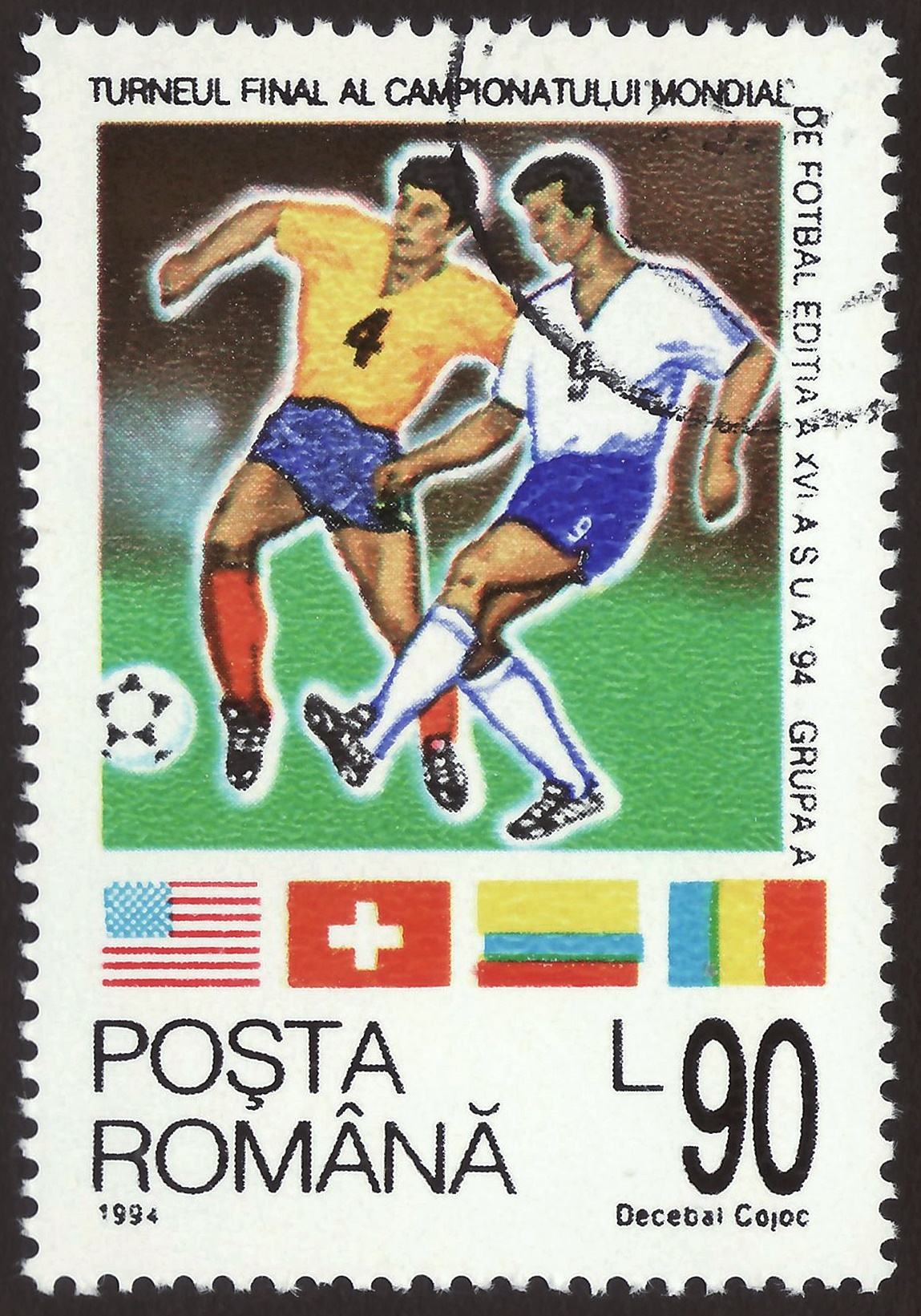
1994 FIFA World Cup stamp issued by Poșta Română

Romania missed out on Euro 1992. Scotland qualified after Romania drew a must-win last match in Sofia against Bulgaria, with Nasko Sirakov's equalizer sealing their fate.

Romania was successful, however, in reaching another World Cup in the United States in 1994. After losing in Belgium and suffering a heavy 5–2 defeat in Czechoslovakia, Romania went into their last match at Cardiff Arms Park with Wales needing a win to pip them to a place in the finals. Goals from Gheorghe Hagi and Dean Saunders meant the game was finely balanced, before Wales were awarded a penalty. Paul Bodin of Swindon Town stepped up but hit the woodwork and Romania went on to win 2–1, Florin Răducioiu's late goal proving unnecessary as Czechoslovakia dropped a point in Belgium and were eliminated.

At the finals, Romania were one of the most entertaining teams in the early stages, with Gheorghe Hagi, Florin Răducioiu and Ilie Dumitrescu on form. Romania beat Colombia 3–1 at the Pasadena Rose Bowl in Los Angeles (all but one of Romania's games took place in California, and they were awarded the advantage of playing most of their games in LA). Răducioiu opened the scoring before Hagi scored a spectacular second from wide on the left touchline. Adolfo Valencia pulled one back with a headed goal just before half-time, but Romania held on and Răducioiu sealed the win with a late third.

In Detroit's indoor Pontiac Silverdome, the temperature soared due to the greenhouse effect in the indoor arena. Switzerland, acclimatized after having already played the hosts there, outran Romania in the second half and turned a 1–1 half time score into a 4–1 win. Romania responded by beating the hosts 1–0 in Pasadena with an early Dan Petrescu goal.

In the Round of 16 knockout stage they faced Argentina, minus Diego Maradona who had been thrown out of the tournament for a positive drug test, in Los Angeles. The suspended Răducioiu was hardly missed, as coach Anghel Iordănescu pushed Dumitrescu forward to play as a striker and the player responded by scoring twice in the first 20 minutes, one a subtle left foot flick from a right-wing Hagi cross slotted between the Argentine defenders. In between, Gabriel Batistuta scored a penalty, but after half-time Romania netted a third on the counterattack, with Hagi beating goalkeeper Luis Islas. Abel Balbo pulled one back, but Romania held on for a shock win.

Romania would suffer penalty heartbreak again in the quarter-final against Sweden in San Francisco. With just 13 minutes to play, a tight match opened up as Sweden's Tomas Brolin scored from a clever free-kick move, the ball passed outside the Romanian wall by Håkan Mild for Brolin to smash in. Iordănescu threw caution to the wind and the returning Răducioiu found a late equalizer, again from a free-kick move but this time down to a deflection and a failure of the Swedes to clear. In extra time Răducioiu scored again after a mistake by Patrik Andersson, but Sweden then scored their own late equalizer as giant striker Kennet Andersson climbed above goalkeeper Florin Prunea to head home a long ball. Prunea had come in after two matches to replace Bogdan Stelea, whose confidence was shattered by the 4–1 loss to the Swiss. In the shoot-out, Dan Petrescu and Miodrag Belodedici had their kicks saved by Thomas Ravelli and Sweden went through.

==== Euro 1996 ====
At Euro 1996, held in England, Romania arrived as a highly thought-of and popular team but had a nightmare. Iordănescu's side were based in the northeast, with their first two games at St James' Park in Newcastle. Against France, they lost to a Christophe Dugarry header reminiscent of Kennet Andersson's two years earlier, beating the goalkeeper to a lofted through ball. An early goal from Bulgaria striker Hristo Stoichkov at St James' Park put Romania on the back foot in Euro 1996, but Dorinel Munteanu appeared to have kept Romania in the match – and in the tournament – with a thunderbolt that hit the bar, bounced over the line, and back out. Referee Peter Mikkelsen merely waved play on, however, and Romania went on to lose the game 1–0, a defeat which sent them out of the tournament.

==== 1998 World Cup ====
Despite a poor performance at Euro 1996, Romania impressed in qualifying, finishing ten points clear of the Republic of Ireland and were seeded for the final tournament of the 1998 World Cup.

Adrian Ilie scored the only goal with a fine chip in their first match against Colombia at Lyon's Stade Gerland. In Toulouse, they met an England side starting with prodigal striker Michael Owen on the bench, with Teddy Sheringham preferred alongside Alan Shearer. A mistake by Tony Adams was punished by Viorel Moldovan, who played for Coventry City, before Owen came on to claim an equalizer. But Romania won with a wonderful late goal from Dan Petrescu, also playing in England with Chelsea, fighting off his club teammate Graeme le Saux and nutmegging goalkeeper David Seaman.

The next match was against a Tunisia side eliminated after losing to both England and Colombia. With England–Colombia being the more decisive game, the Stade de France in Paris was an 80,000-strong sell out and the crowd were nearly rewarded with a shock as Skander Souayah scored an early penalty to give the north Africans the lead. Romania needed a point to win the group and avoid Argentina in the round of 16, and got it when Moldovan volleyed a late equalizer. It did them little good, however, as in the round of 16 match at Bordeaux against Croatia, Davor Šuker scored a twice-taken penalty to eliminate Romania.

=== Emerich Jenei (2000, 2nd spell) ===
==== Euro 2000 ====
Line-ups for Romania versus England at the UEFA Euro 2000

Romania had a strong qualifying campaign, winning a tough Group 7 with Portugal, Slovakia, Hungary, Azerbaijan and Liechtenstein. The Romanians impressed, never losing and winning seven times, including a big upset in Porto after defeating Portugal thanks to a late goal scored by Dorinel Munteanu. In Bucharest, the score finished 1–1.

At Euro 2000, held in Belgium and the Netherlands, Romania were drawn against defending champions Germany, 1996 semi-finalists England and a strong Portugal side who would host the next tournament in 2004. The chances for the Romanians to qualify through quarter-finals were seen as slim.

Romania, however, started brightly against the Germans in Liège, with Viorel Moldovan scoring from close range. A long-range Mehmet Scholl equalizer meant they had to be content with a point and their position looked shaky after Costinha headed a last minute winner for Portugal in their second match.

Emerich Jenei, back as coach, threw caution to the wind in the last match in Charleroi against England, a must-win match for Romania. Defender Cristian Chivu's cross went in off the post in the 22nd minute, but despite Romania dominating, England led at half-time through an Alan Shearer penalty and a late Michael Owen goal after he rounded goalkeeper Bogdan Stelea to score a tap-in, both in the last five minutes of the half. Romania attacked after the break and were quickly rewarded; Dorinel Munteanu punishing a poor punch from Nigel Martyn, a late replacement for injured goalkeeper David Seaman, to equalize three minutes after the restart. England cracked under the pressure. Unable to retain possession or pose an attacking threat, they fell deep and late on Phil Neville, playing out of position at left-back, conceded a penalty scored by Ioan Ganea in the 89th minute.

Romania's relief was tempered by tough opposition in the last eight, and Italy, who would end up seconds from being crowned European champions in an agonizing final, comfortably saw them off 2–0 in Brussels. Francesco Totti and Filippo Inzaghi scoring towards the end of the first half. In the 35th minute, Gheorghe Hagi, in his final international tournament, hit the woodwork with goalkeeper Francesco Toldo stranded off his line and, after the break, was sent off for diving. Romania's tournament was over and Emerich Jenei left his job as coach again.

=== 2000s – World Cup dry spell (Jenei, Hagi's first spell, Anghel Iordănescu (2001-2004, 2nd spell)) ===
Romania failed to qualify for the next three major tournaments. They drew Slovenia, who had been surprise qualifiers for Euro 2000 in a playoff for a place in the 2002 World Cup in South Korea and Japan. A narrow 2–1 deficit – having led through a Marius Niculae goal – after the first leg in Ljubljana was not irretrievable. With fan hero Gheorghe Hagi now coaching the side, they were confident of getting the win they needed in Bucharest against the Balkan upstarts, but Slovenia took the lead before the hour through Mladen Rudonja. Right wing-back Cosmin Contra quickly equalized but Romania in the extra time and Slovenia, with maverick manager Srečko Katanec, were in a major tournament again. After the group Romania gad an amazing adventure in the play-offs and they eventually got in the finals where they beat Italy 3-2.

==== Euro 2004 ====
Romania were confident of qualifying for the tournament, drawn in Group 2 with seeds Denmark, Norway, Bosnia and Herzegovina and minnows Luxembourg, with Anghel Iordănescu back as coach. Despite a good start – a 3–0 win away to Bosnia in Sarajevo – Romania stuttered. Steffen Iversen's late goal gave Norway a surprise win in Bucharest and they were stunned at home by the Danes, 5–2, with Thomas Gravesen scoring a spectacular goal from around 50 yards out, after leading twice. They recovered slightly, completing a double over the Bosnians and earning a point in Oslo, but conceded a cutting injury time equalizer in Denmark to draw 2–2. It was decisive, as they now required Norway to fail to win at home to Luxembourg to stand any realistic chance of qualifying. Eventually, the Danes got a point in Bosnia to scrape through a tight group, with Norway going to a play-off with Spain.

=== Victor Pițurcă (2005-2009, 2nd spell) ===
==== 2006 World Cup ====
Romania were drawn with the Netherlands and the Czech Republic, who were ranked first and second in Europe respectively in 2006 World Cup qualification. Early wins over Finland and Macedonia were unconvincing, and they were behind the two leaders by the time they earned a 2–0 home win over the Czechs. Despite a record of eight wins, three losses and one draw, they finished third behind the Dutch and the Czechs and missed out on another major tournament.

==== Euro 2008 ====
Romania were drawn in a group with the Netherlands again, along with Bulgaria for Euro 2008 qualifying. Romania, however, performed well, losing only away against Bulgaria and beating the Netherlands 1–0 at home with a goal scored by Dorin Goian from a suspicious offside position not seen by referee Kyros Vassaras. On 17 October 2007, Romania became the fourth team to qualify for Euro 2008, the nation's first international tournament since Euro 2000. Coincidentally, Victor Pițurcă also led Romania to qualification for Euro 2000, only to sit back and let Emerich Jenei coach the team in the final tournament; this time, however, he stayed in the role, the first time he coached a national team in the final stages of a tournament.

Romania was drawn in the so-called "Group of death" alongside the Netherlands, world champions Italy and France, runners-up in the 2006 World Cup. Romania started with a 0–0 draw against a lacklustre France while Italy were soundly beaten by the Netherlands, 3–0. In their next match, against Italy, Adrian Mutu opened the scoring early in the second half. Their lead was a very short one, however, as Italy's Christian Panucci scored a minute later off of a corner kick. Nearing the end of the match, Daniel Niculae earned a penalty for his team, but goalkeeper Gianluigi Buffon saved the subsequent Mutu penalty, leaving Romania with two points and needing a win against the Netherlands, who defeated France 4–1 that same evening. The Netherlands beat Romania 2–0 in the final game of the group, which meant that Italy joined the Netherlands in the quarter-finals and Romania finished third, ahead of France.

=== Răzvan Lucescu era (2009-2011) ===
==== 2010 World Cup ====
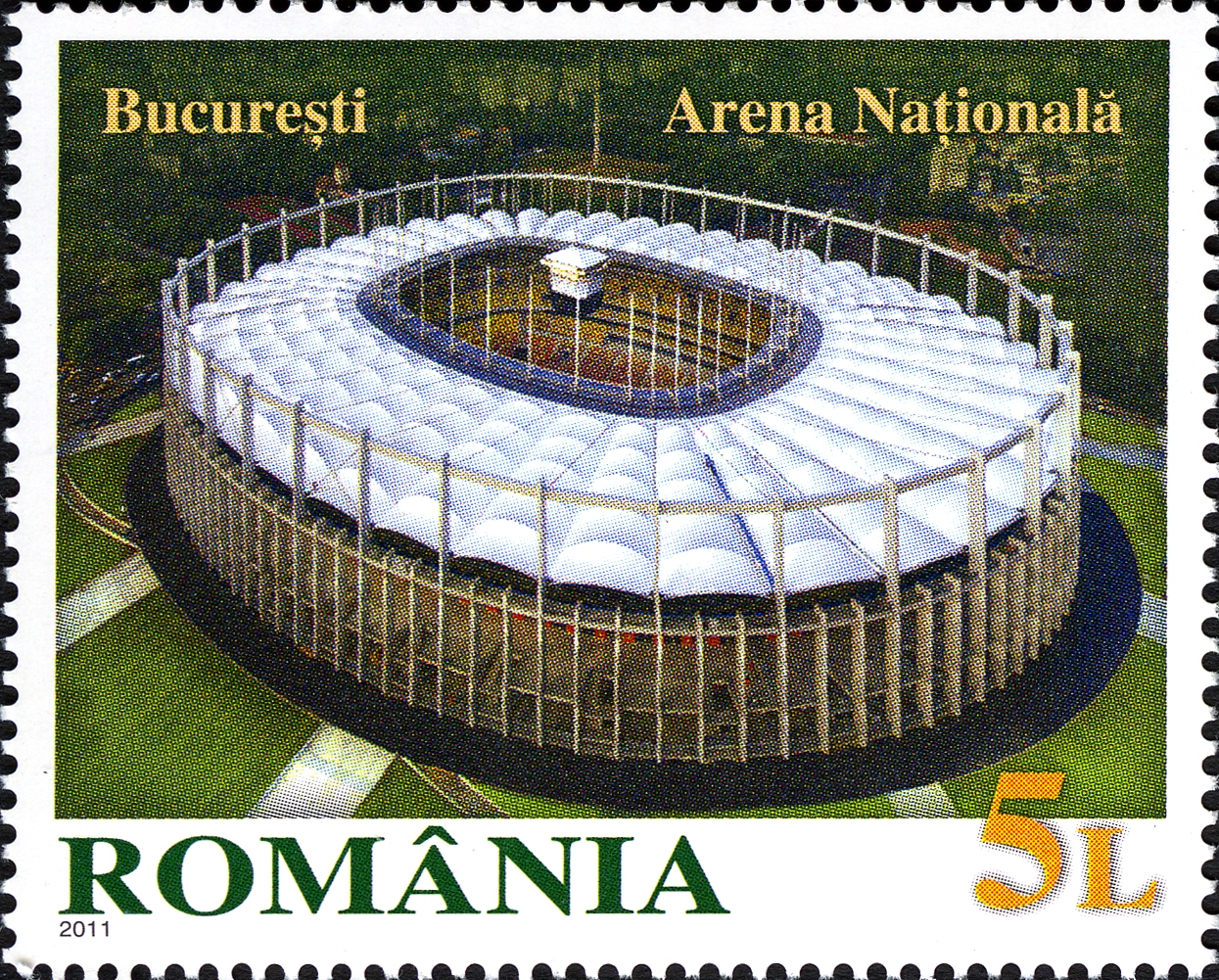
Arena Națională, opened in 2011, the national stadium of Romania, as seen on a Romanian stamp (2011)

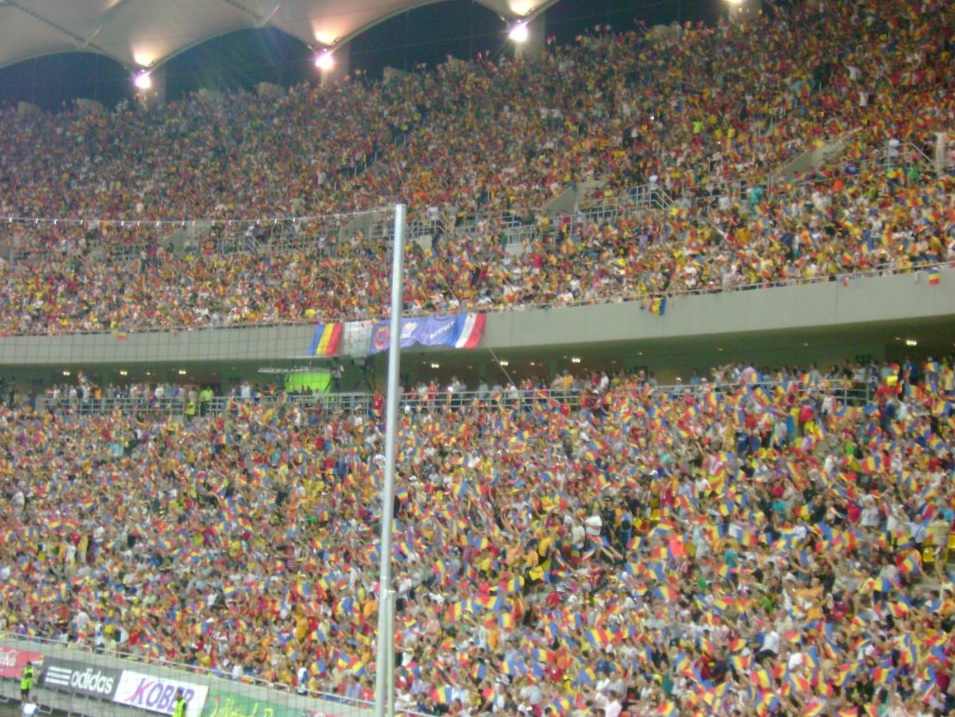
Romanian fans at the new Arena Națională in June 2013

Romania were drawn into the UEFA qualifying round for the 2010 World Cup alongside France, Serbia, Austria, Lithuania and the Faroe Islands. Although Romania were seeded in the second pot, they eventually finished fifth, above only the Faroe Islands. Their campaign was a disaster that began with a 3–0 home loss to Lithuania and included a 5–0 trashing in Belgrade by Serbia. Furthermore, various problems were caused during the poor campaign, such as the retirement from international football of Cosmin Contra, Mirel Rădoi and Adrian Mutu (the latter would later be recalled after a year's absence). Coach Victor Pițurcă resigned and was replaced by Răzvan Lucescu.

=== Victor Pițurcă (2011-2014, 3rd spell) ===
==== Euro 2012 ====
In Euro 2012 qualifying, Romania was drawn into Group D along with France, Bosnia and Herzegovina, Belarus, Albania and Luxembourg. Although the team initially seemed prepared to continue their awful form from their disastrous World Cup campaign, beginning with a 1–1 draw with Pot 5 members Albania and following up with a goalless draw with Belarus and a pair of losses to France and Bosnia and Herzegovina, the team was able to rebound somewhat and register their first two victories. The first was a win against Luxembourg and the second was an important win in the rematch against Bosnia and Herzegovina. Romania's last decent result came when they battled France to a goalless draw before ending the campaign the way it began – two disappointing draws with Albania and Belarus. They finished qualification in a distant third place and only one point ahead of Belarus.

==== 2014 World Cup ====
Romania were drawn into the 2014 FIFA World Cup qualifying round with the Netherlands, Turkey, Hungary, Estonia and Andorra. They made an impressive start with a 2–0 away win in Estonia followed by a 4–0 win at home against modest Andorra and another away win in Turkey (1–0). After that, Romania were defeated by the Netherlands, both at home and away, and managed to secure only a draw in Hungary, in between. Romania started the last part of the campaign with a victory at home, against Hungary, but was defeated by Turkey. The last two match days were decisive, with Romania securing its place in the play-off with two wins, against Andorra and Estonia, while qualification rivals Turkey and Hungary were both defeated by the winner of the group, the Netherlands. Romania were drawn to play Greece for a place in the World Cup finals, but a 3–1 loss in Greece and a 1–1 home draw ended its run.

=== Anghel Iordănescu (2014-2016, 3rd spell) ===
==== UEFA Euro 2016 ====
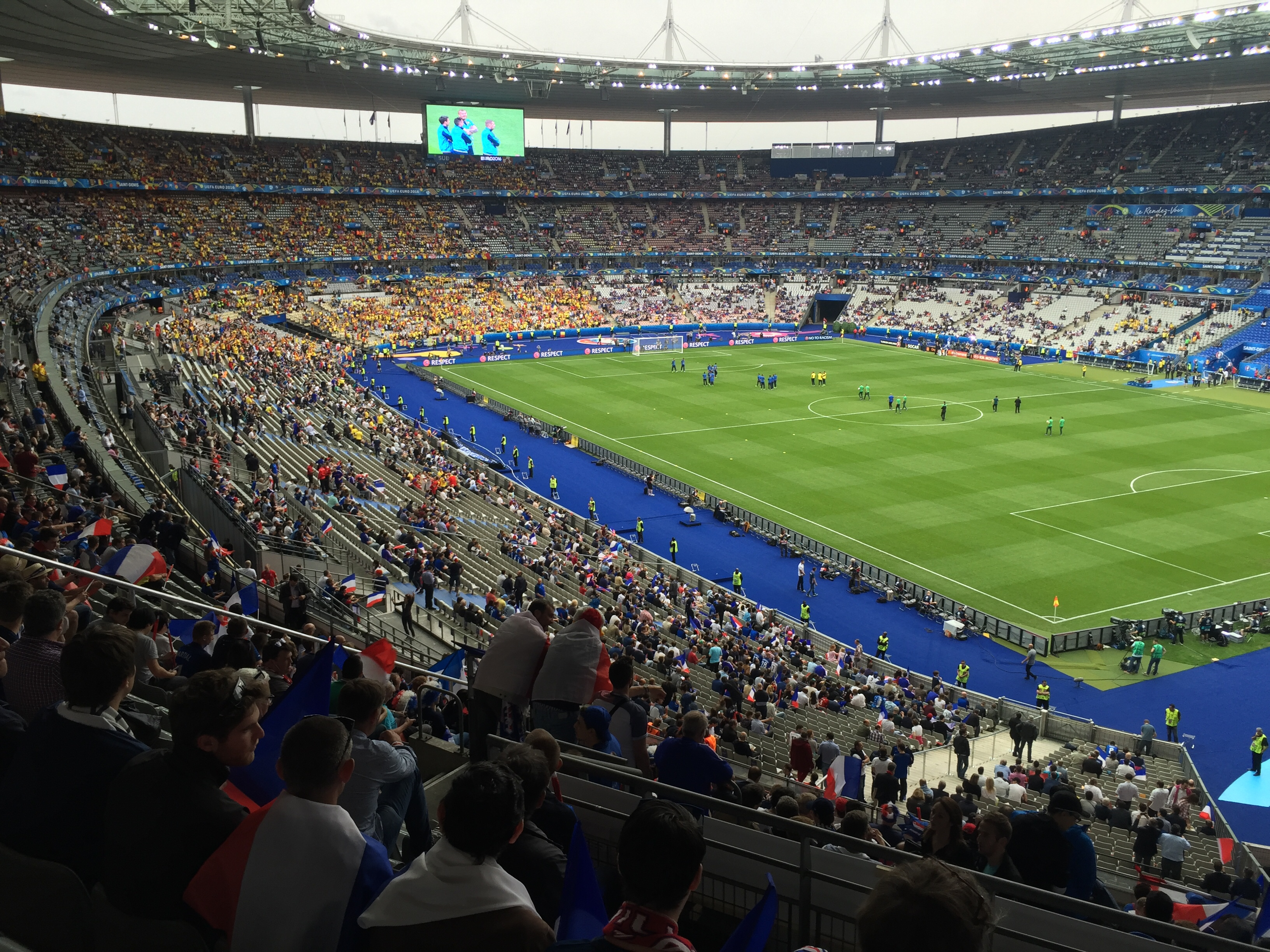
France's 2–1 win over Romania at the Stade de France opened the UEFA Euro 2016.

For the qualifying stage of the Euro 2016 Romania was drawn into Group F along with Greece, Hungary, Finland, Northern Ireland and the Faroe Islands. Romania began its first successful qualification campaign since 2008 with a win over Greece before following up with a 1–1 draw with Pot 2 team Hungary and a 2–0 win over Finland. Despite the initial success, Romania decided to part with coach Victor Pițurcă by mutual consent. Anghel Iordănescu came out of retirement to return to coach Romania for a third time.

Under Iordănescu, Romania was able to follow up with comfortable 2–0 win over Northern Ireland and, despite a disappointing 1–0 win over the Faroe Islands and a 0–0 draw in the return game against Northern Ireland, Romania remained on top of Group F, one point above Northern Ireland and three points above third-placed Hungary. After a goalless draw in the match against Hungary in Budapest, however, the team fell back on the second place, one point behind Northern Ireland and three above Hungary, still placed third. Following a 1–1 draw clinched in overtime at home against Finland, Romania secured their spot at the final tournament in the last game after a confident 3–0 win in the Faroe Islands. Romania finished the qualification group second, one point behind group winners Northern Ireland, completing their first successful qualification campaign in eight years undefeated after five wins and five draws. With only two goals conceded, Romania had the best defence in the qualifiers.

Romania advanced to Euro 2016, where they were drawn in Group A, being named to play the opening match against the hosts France. The match began better for the Romanian side, who almost scored the first goal of the tournament in the fourth minute, after Bogdan Stancu tricked the French defence at a corner kick executed by his co-national Nicușor Stanciu and his shot was narrowly saved by the French goalkeeper Hugo Lloris. Shortly after the half-time, France dominated, and scored the first goal of the tournament after a header by Olivier Giroud in the 57th minute. Less than eight minutes later, Nicușor Stanciu was fouled by Patrice Evra in the French box, and Hungarian referee Viktor Kassai gave Romania a penalty which Bogdan Stancu scored. With the match coming to an end, just after Romania narrowly missed an opportunity after a free kick, Dimitri Payet shot hard from outside the box and scored France's second goal, crushing Romania's dream of a perfect start in the Euros.

In the second match, Romania faced Switzerland, in a match that began with the Swiss side dominating. In the 17th minute, Alexandru Chipciu was fouled in the box, the second penalty of the tournament being accorded again to Romania. The same Bogdan Stancu went on and scored, giving an advantage for the Romanian side. Just after Switzerland almost scored an own goal, Admir Mehmedi scored for an equalizer in the 57th minute. The match eventually finished in a 1–1 draw.

With one point accumulated and on the third place in the group before the final match, Romania needed a victory against Albania in order to be among the first four best-third-placed teams and to qualify further in Euro. The match began good for the Romanian side, but Armando Sadiku's header in the 43rd minute went past Ciprian Tătărușanu, giving Albania the lead and their first ever goal in a tournament. The despondent Romanian side failed to score in this match, with Florin Andone striking the post in the 76th minute. The negative score meant that Romania ended on the last place of the group, ending their Euro dream with no victory and after one draw, two defeats, two goals scored (both from penalties) and four conceded, with only one point, the poor results making the manager Anghel Iordănescu to resign before the matches for the 2018 FIFA World Cup qualifiers began three months later.

=== Christoph Daum era (2016-2017) ===
==== 2018 FIFA World Cup qualification ====
It was German manager Christoph Daum who took the place of Anghel Iordănescu for the next qualifying campaign. Due to FIFA's ranking revamp, Romania was drawn from Pot 1, having to face Denmark, Poland, Montenegro, Armenia and Kazakhstan. The campaign began with a mediocre 1–1 draw against Montenegro in Cluj-Napoca, followed by a thrashing 5–0 victory in Yerevan against Armenia before another mediocre draw in Astana against Kazakhstan, a 0–3 defeat in Bucharest and a 1–3 defeat in Warsaw against Poland, a lacklustre 0–0 draw against Denmark in Cluj-Napoca and a lucky victory in the last minutes against Armenia in Bucharest.

=== Cosmin Contra era (2017-2019) ===
With only nine points after seven fixtures, Romania had to win against the revelation of the group, Montenegro, in Podgorica, but failed amid a Stevan Jovetić winner and were mathematically eliminated, leading to the sacking of Daum and his replacement with Cosmin Contra. This defeat was followed by a 3–1 victory against Kazakhstan in Ploiești before a lucky 1–1 draw against Denmark in Copenhagen. Romania ended fourth in the group, with 13 points, twelve goals scored and ten conceded.

==== 2018–19 UEFA Nations League ====
The poor performance in the qualifiers meant Romania would be in the League C of UEFA's first season of the new competition, the Nations League. They were drawn against neighbours Serbia, Montenegro again and Baltic side Lithuania.

In the first match, Romania registered yet another mediocre result against Montenegro, in a 0–0 draw in Ploiești, before a double comeback in Serbia in a 2–2 draw and a late-winner in Vilnius against Lithuania. This was followed by another 0–0 draw in Bucharest against Serbia, in which Dušan Tadić missed a penalty and a comfortable 3–0 victory over Lithuania in Ploiești.

Overall results meant that it was possible for Romania to win the group shall it win in Podgorica against Montenegro and Serbia lose to Lithuania in Belgrade. Despite Romania actually emerging victorious from the duel against the Montenegrins, Serbia comfortably won against Lithuania and won the group. However, following UEFA's revamp of the competition, Romania, as the second place, promoted too in League B for the next edition.

=== Mirel Rădoi era (2019-2021) ===
==== UEFA Euro 2020 qualification ====
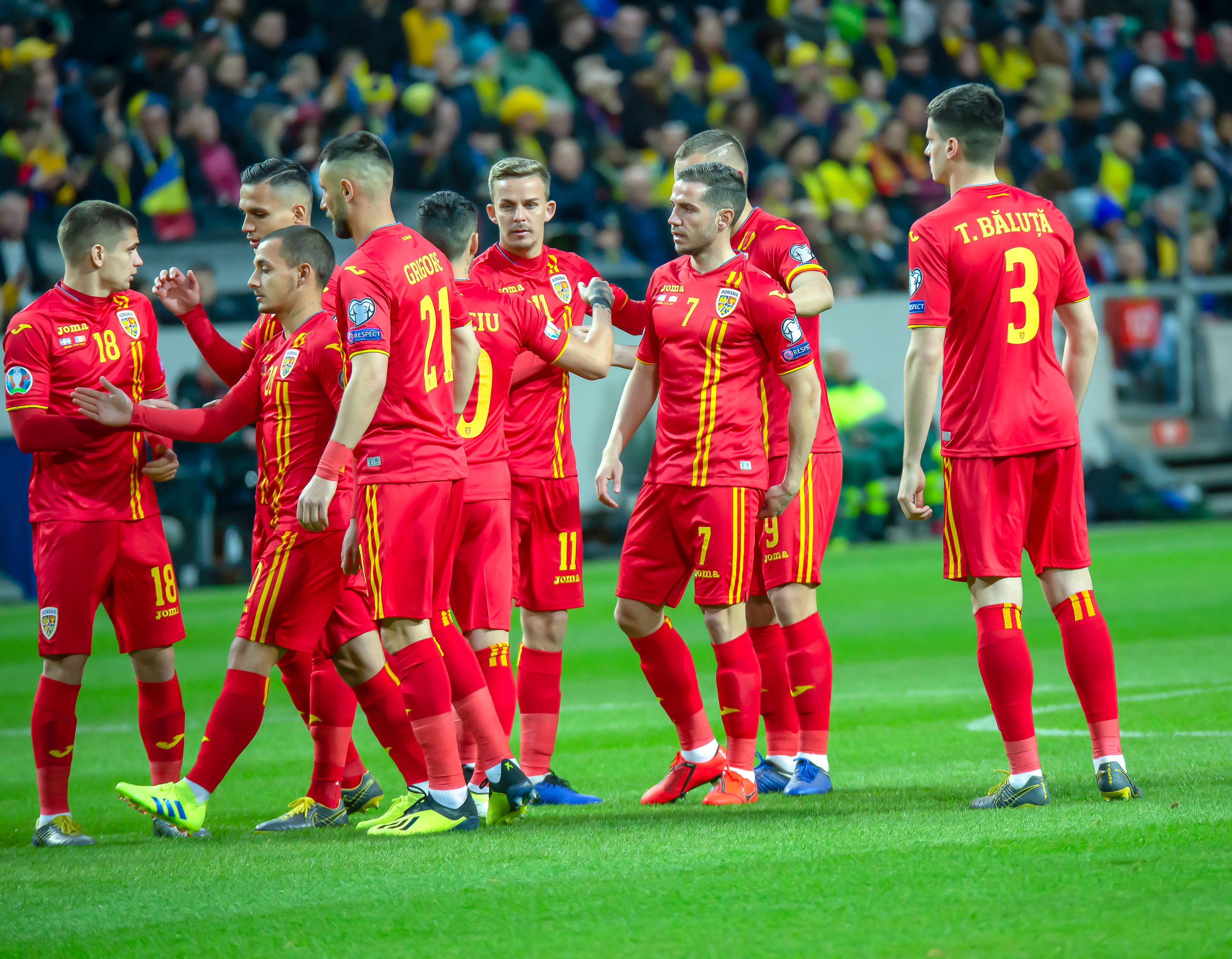
Romania playing Sweden at Friends Arena, March 2019

For the qualifiers of Euro 2020, Romania was drawn in a group including Spain, Sweden, and Norway alongside Malta and the Faroe Islands. In the opening game, Romania suffered a 1–2 defeat to Sweden in Stockholm, followed by a comfortable 4–1 victory over the Faroe Islands in Cluj-Napoca and a 2–2 draw with Norway in Oslo, with Claudiu Keșerü scoring in the last minute.

Eventually, Romania stayed on track by defeating Malta in a 4–0 victory in Valletta, but it was later followed by a defeat to Spain in Bucharest, with two very late misses from George Pușcaș and Dragoș Grigore, and a poor 1–0 victory against Malta. This meant Romania had to win against Norway in October, but after a goal from Alexandru Mitriță in the 62nd minute, Alexander Sørloth scored in the last minute and the match in Bucharest ended 1–1. This had significantly reduced their chances of automatic qualification, as they had to meet the Swedish and Spanish sides for the two remaining competitive games.

A 0–2 defeat to Sweden in Bucharest ensured Romania's fail to finish on any of the automatic qualification places. In the last matchday, they were thrashed by Spain in Madrid in a 0–5 defeat, meaning they would end the campaign with seventeen goals scored but also fifteen conceded. Due to the revamp of the previous Nations League and poor performance of Greece, Romania managed to grab the last spot for UEFA Euro 2020 qualifying play-offs, and was drawn in Path A. Shall it had won it, Romania would have been drawn in Group C of the final tournament, but it did not, Iceland winning in Reykjavík and eliminating them. Their performance cost Cosmin Contra his coaching position, as he was changed with Mirel Rădoi before the play-offs.

==== 2020–21 UEFA Nations League ====
For the second Nations League edition, Romania was drawn against Austria, Norway and Northern Ireland. A very lacklustre 1–1 draw against Northern Ireland in the first matchday was followed by an impressing 3–2 victory over Austria in Klagenfurt am Wörthersee. This meant that, after the first two matchdays, Romania was on the first place and supposed to promote to League A, but a 0–4 defeat to Norway in Oslo and a 0–1 defeat to Austria on homesoil meant Romania would fall back on the third place before the last two matches.

For the home match against Norway, the Romanians were given a 3–0 victory from UEFA after the impossibility of Norwegians to travel to Bucharest, following Omar Elabdellaoui's positive test for COVID-19 and the restrictive measures imposed by the Norwegian Ministry of Health. Another 1–1 draw against Northern Ireland in Belfast meant Romania would end on the third position and remain in League B.

==== 2022 FIFA World Cup qualification ====
Following an acceptable Nations League campaign, Romania was drawn from Pot 2 in the 2022 FIFA World Cup qualifiers, in a group with Germany, Euro 2016 revelation Iceland who eliminated them from UEFA Euro 2020 qualifying play-offs two months prior, future revelation North Macedonia, Armenia again and Liechtenstein. In their first match, Romania managed a hard victory over North Macedonia in Bucharest after two quick Macedonian goals and a late winner from Ianis Hagi. Three days later, Germany managed a victory over them on the same stadium despite a huge opportunity from Nicolae Stanciu in the last minutes. This was followed by a shameful 2–3 defeat to Armenia in Yerevan.

Poor performance in the June friendlies, combined with the results so far gave the feeling of another poor World Cup campaign, just like last time, before a shocking 2–0 victory over Iceland in Reykjavík, followed by a mediocre 2–0 victory over Liechtenstein and a 0–0 draw in Skopje against North Macedonia. Initial group revelation Armenia fell behind in the following matches and it was Romania and North Macedonia who'd fight for the second place, but despite a heroic defeat to Germany, in which Romania held the lead for almost an hour, and a victory over Armenia in Bucharest, a 0–0 draw against Iceland meant that Romania would depend on Iceland to hold a draw against North Macedonia in the last matchday. North Macedonia won, however, and went over Romania by a single point, eliminating them from another campaign.

=== Edward Iordănescu era (2022-2024) ===
==== 2022–23 UEFA Nations League ====
Romania was drawn from Pot 3 in the 2022–23 UEFA Nations League season, in a group against Bosnia and Herzegovina, Finland and Montenegro. In a similar scenario like five years prior, Montenegro comfortably won against Romania 2–0 in Podgorica, which was then followed by another defeat, to Bosnia and Herzegovina in Zenica and a lacklustre victory over Finland in Bucharest.

With little to nothing achieved so far, Romania was crushed by Montenegro in Bucharest in a 0–3 defeat, meaning that chances to retain the place in League B were dim. A 1–1 draw against Finland in Helsinki meant Romania was again at the expense of other team, this time Montenegro, who needed not to lose against Finland, which eventually happened despite Romania's comfortable victory over eventual group winners Bosnia and Herzegovina. Therefore, Romania relegated to League C for the next Nations League edition.

==== UEFA Euro 2024 ====
The Nations League performance meant Romania would be drawn from Pot 3 in Euro 2024 qualifiers, which led them to a group with Switzerland, Israel, Kosovo, Belarus and Andorra. Two initial victories against Andorra and Belarus in Bucharest, followed by a lacklustre 0–0 against Kosovo in Pristina gave the impression of another despondent campaign before a shocking comeback against Switzerland in Lucerne, Valentin Mihăilă scoring a brace in the last three minutes. This was then followed by a 1–1 draw against Israel in Bucharest before a controversial match against Kosovo; the match was interrupted for almost an hour after Romanian fans began chastising Kosovar players and chanting anti-NATO chants, with the Kosovars leaving the pitch in protest. Two late goals for Romania after the match restarted, a draw against Belarus on neutral pitch because of their involvement with the Russian military operations in Ukraine and a comfortable victory over Andorra meant Romania had to obtain a single point in the ninth matchday in order to mathematically qualify for Euro 2024.

In the ninth matchday. Romania faced a tired Israeli side, who had to play four games in nine days because of the Israel-Palestine war, on neutral pitch. Eran Zahavi stunned Romania in the 88th second of the match before George Pușcaș scored an equalizer eight minutes later. One hour in the match, Ianis Hagi assured Romania's qualification to Euro 2024 with a goal that meant Romania would win 2–1 over Israel. Moreover, Romania went on and won against Switzerland in Bucharest too, meaning they would win the group and be drawn from Pot 2 at the final tournament, in a heroic act of the Tricolours.

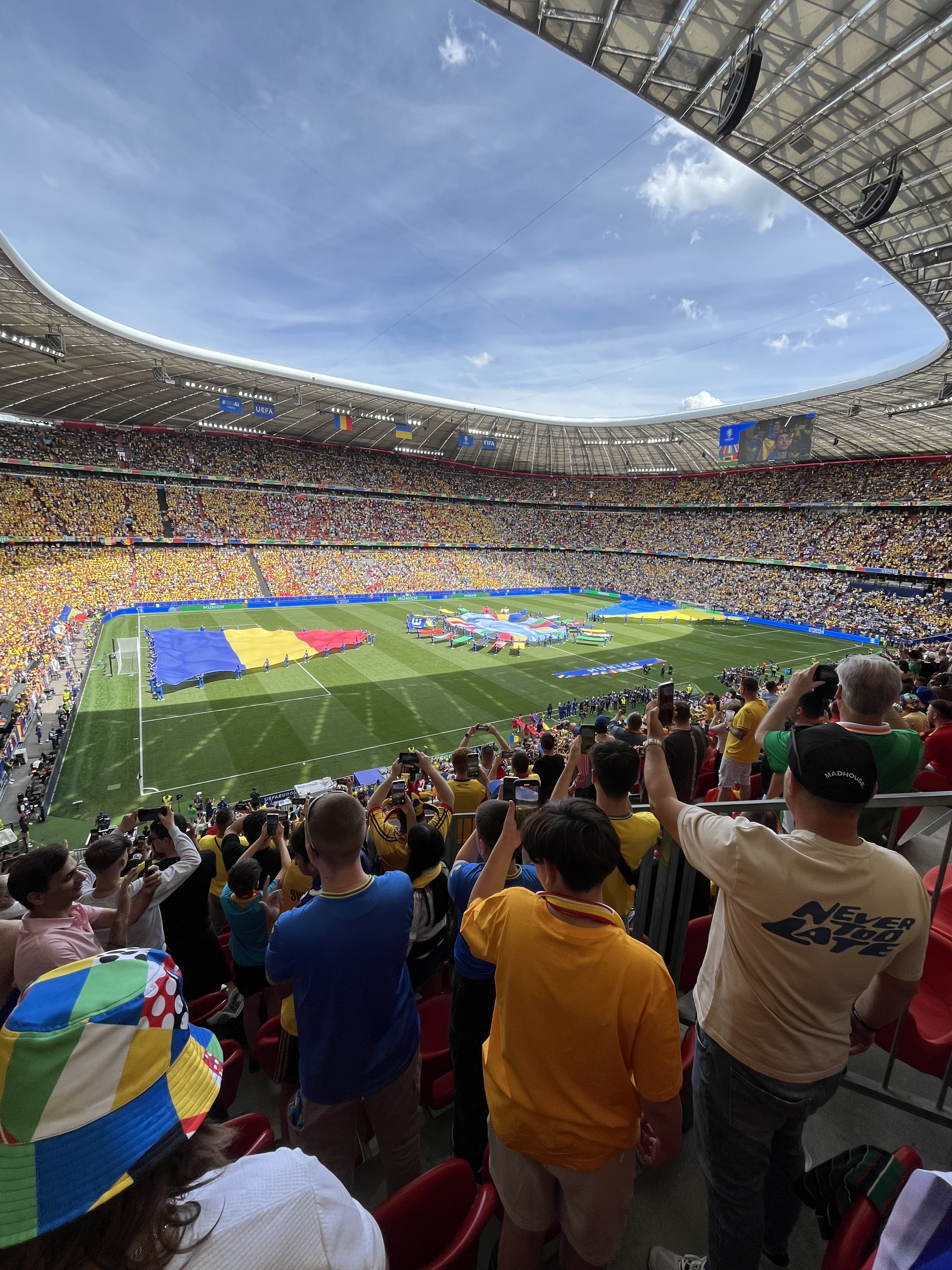
EURO 2024 Matchday 1 game opening Romania vs Ukraine

At the final tournament, Romania was drawn against Belgium, Slovakia and neighbours Ukraine in Group E. In the first matchday, Romania met Ukraine in Munich, and achieved their best result in the European Championship final tournament: a Nicolae Stanciu screamer that came in as the fourth most beautiful goal of the tournament, a long shot from Răzvan Marin and a tap-in from Denis Drăguș gave Romania a 3–0 victory after not playing in an international tournament for eight years. The victory was only the second victory of Romania at a European Championship, the first and only other one being against England in 2000 in a 3–2 with a last minute winner. Following this performance, in the second matchday, Romania was stunned by Youri Tielemans of Belgium in the 74th second, and despite putting a decent fight, lost the match 0–2, Kevin De Bruyne scoring a controversial goal in the final minutes.

All the four teams had the same amount of points at the end of the second matchday, three, but because of the overall goal difference, Romania was on the first position at this point, with three goals scored and a +1 difference. In the third matchday, Slovakia and Romania drew in a comfortable match as both teams assured qualification at that score, as neither Ukraine or Belgium managed to win the other match. With the table unchanged from the second matchday, Romania was crowned as the group winner despite all the teams ending with four points, having a victory against fourth place Ukraine, a better goal difference than third place Slovakia and more goals scored than second place Belgium.

In the Round of 16, Romania returned to Munich and faced the Netherlands. Despite a good start, Cody Gakpo stunned the Tricolours in the 20th minute, before Donyell Malen's brace in the last minutes. Despite losing 0–3 against the Dutch side and leaving the tournament relatively early, Romania's performance was praised by numerous figures of the football world, achieving a very good result for the overall level of the national team.

=== Mircea Lucescu (2024-2026, 2nd spell) ===
Romania then secured promotion to League B for the 2026-2027 edition of the Nations League thanks to a perfect record of 6 wins in as many matches against their 3 opponents, Kosovo, Cyprus and Lithuania, including a green-card home win in the return against Kosovo after the Kosovar players decided to abandon the match following incidents in the stands.

However, Romania fell back into the pattern of recent years and jeopardised their chances of qualification by losing at home at the start of the 2026 World Cup qualifiers against Bosnia (0–1), their main rival for the 2nd play-off place behind group favourites Austria, on 21 March 2025, while the Bosnians were still on a negative run; after a disappointing Romanian performance against an opponent that was more aggressive both offensively and defensively, and during a match that saw a refereeing controversy with a penalty not awarded to the Romanians for a Bosnian handball in the penalty area.

==== 2026 FIFA World Cup qualifiers ====
Romania finished third in their qualifying group after failing to beat Bosnia and Cyprus, although they managed a 1-0 win against Austria with a 90+5 header by Virgil Ghiță.

However, by winning their Nations League group, the Eastern European country managed to reach the playoffs. They travelled to Istanbul to play what would be Mircea Lucescu's final match as a manager. Romania played a solid game, even hitting the woodwork thrice. Two shots hit the post but were ruled offside, while the third and final shot that hit the post was not offside and represented Romania's final opportunity to equalise with a curled kick from captain Nicolae Stanciu. The match ended 1-0 for Turkey with a goal by Premier League full-back Ferdi Kadıoğlu, sealing Romania's World Cup dream, as they wait another four years for the eighth time.

Former captain of the national team and the greatest Romanian footballer, Gheorghe Hagi, took over as manager following the death of Mircea Lucescu. Hagi debuted on the bench for the first time in 25 years for the Romanian national team on 2 June 2026 in a friendly tie against Georgia in Tbilsi.

=== Gheorghe Hagi (2026 - present, 2nd spell) ===
Hagi's first win while on the bench during this tenure was against Wales in a friendly match 4 days later, on 4 June. A goal by Florinel Coman in the 52nd minute put the Tricolours ahead, while a goal by Wales side David Brooks equalized 11 minutes later. Adrian Rus scored the second goal for Romania in the 80th minute, resulting in a win for the Romanians.

Five months later, having won their league in the 2024/2025 Nations League season, Romania promoted to League B. They were drawn into urn 3, along with Bosnia, Poland and Sweden. On the first matchday, Romania started with a 1-2 loss against Sweden, with goals from Viktor Gyökeres and Alexander Isak, respectively, their only goal being scored by Dennis Man. Three days later, on 28 September, the Romanian side suffered a 4-2 thrashing by Bosnia & Herzegovina, the formers netting three goals in the first half and a fourth one in the second. The Tricolours lagged behind, scoring 2 goals through Daniel Bîrligea and Alexandru Cicâldău.

Having already suffered two losses and being placed last in their group with 0 points, they headed to an apparently uncertatin match against the Poland national team, who themselves had 5 matches in a row without a victory, one of them a loss to Sweden and another a tie against Bosnia, besides a failed 2026 World Cup qualification campaign. The match began relatively slow, having hit the 20 minute mark without a goal. Two minutes later, a cross found Robert Lewandowski near the Romanian penalty box. Radu Drăgușintapped the Polish captain causing him to fall inside the penalty area. Referee Urs Schnyder sent Drăgușin off in a controversial red card and awarded the Polish side a penalty kick, which Lewandowski managed to score. The first half's end saw the Romanians at a slight 0-1 disadvantage. What followed in the second half was one of the worst defeats for the Romanian national football team since a 1-7 loss to the Swiss 59 years prior, in 1967. Forced to play with 10 people, the Tricoulours' defense collapsed and the Polish dominated. Lewandowski scored a hattrick with two more goals; an own goal by Virgil Ghiță and two more by Jan Bednarek and Piotr Zieliński made the final scoreline a devastating 0-6 loss for the Romanians.

Three days later, they suffered another defeat against Sweden, a 0-1 loss, Viktor Gyökeres being the sole scorer of the match. Out of all the 4 disputed matches, the Romanians had lost all of them.

Facing calls for resignation following one of the worst debuts for a Romanian coach on the national bench, Hagi refused to step down and said he will remain as long as he feel up to the task.

More than a month later, Romania faced a rematch against Poland in the same Nations League group stage, this time playing at home. With a yellow card shown to Drăgușin in the second minute, the match seemed to be a repeat of the 0-6 loss a month prior. The first half ended with an unchanged scoreboard, 0-0. Fifteen minutes later, the Romanians netted a goal against the Polish through Florinel Coman, but it was disallowed due to a fault from Rațiu during the buildup. Ten minutes later, in the 68th minute, Alexandru Cicâldău scored the match's first goal with a shot that disoriented the Poles' Bartłomiej Drągowski. Only 4 minutes later, the Romanians scored again through Dennis Man, with an assist from Daniel Bîrligea. In minute 82, Marcel Reguła gave the Polish a faint hope of a comeback, making the scoreboard show 2-1 with an assist from Sebastian Szymański. That hope was extinguished, though, as the end of the match marked Romania's first victory in their Nations League campaign.

== Team image ==
=== Rivalries ===
==== Hungary ====
Romania's most fierce rivalry is against their neighbours Hungary. The reason for the rivalry are the general feelings for the other country, as Hungary and Romania have a long-standing dispute over certain parts of Romania that were historically part of Hungary, most well-known being Transylvania. This has been the subject of the constant squabble between Hungarian and Romanian fans during the direct matches of the two countries or clubs from them.

The first match between the two countries took place in Bucharest, on 4 October 1936. Romania initially took the lead through Silviu Bindea, but two goals in the second half scored by Gyula Lázár and Géza Toldi led to Hungary's victory. At that moment, Hungary was, if not the best, among the best teams on the planet, and after this result, impressive results of the Hungarians were obtained during their matches against Romania, most notably the worst defeat of Romania to date, a 0–9 defeat in Budapest on 6 June 1948. Other notable Hungarian victories include the 7–2 on 30 September 1945, two 5-1s, one in Bucharest on 24 October 1948 and one in Budapest on 19 September 1954, and a 3–0 in Bucharest on 12 October 1947.

Romania's first victory against Hungary came almost 63 years after the first match, in the seventeenth derby overall. Romania won 2–0 in Bucharest on 5 June 1999, in the qualifying stage of UEFA Euro 2000. Since then, Hungary has yet to defeat Romania again, and Romania won five more times, including a notable 3–0 in the qualifying stage of the 2014 FIFA World Cup.

Due to the general antipathy between the two peoples, derbies often led to skirmishes between the two fans. The worst incidents were recorded on 6 September 2013 and 11 October 2014, during the derbies of the two countries in Bucharest for the 2014 FIFA World Cup and UEFA Euro 2016, respectively. During the first match, Hungarians lit many flames, booed the Romanian anthem, and after the 0–3 defeat were quickly transported back home, not before some of them fought with Romanian fans in the Old Town of Bucharest. After Romania's elimination in the Second Round by Greece, many Hungarians thanked Greeks and publicly insulted Romania on their social media accounts. One year later, the fights between the two groups of fans led to 58 people seeking medical care after Romanian fans jumped the fence separating their sector from the one Hungarian fans were in and attacked them. The match ended 1-1 and fights were again commenced in the Old Town, where many terraces of the local coffee shops and bars were destroyed by Hungarian fans.

Notable opportunities when the two teams have met include: the football tournament of the 1952 Summer Olympics, the qualifying stages for UEFA Euro 1972, 2000 and 2016 and the qualifying stages for the FIFA World Cups of 1982, 2002 and 2014.

==== Greece ====
A notable rivalry was built with Greece, as it is the team Romania has met the most times: thirty-six (Romania met Yugoslavia thirty-seven times, a record which was annulled after the dismantle of Yugoslavia). Out of all the matches overall, Romania won eighteen of them, dominating the rivalry. Greece won an additional eight matches and ten ended in a draw.

The only notable opportunity the two teams have met was in the Second Round of the 2014 FIFA World Cup, to which Greece qualifying after defeating Romania in a two-legged play-off, winning 3–1 in Athens and drawing 1–1 in Bucharest.

==== Minor rivalries ====
===== Montenegro =====
The last years oversaw the building of an unofficial rivalry with the Montenegrin national team. The two sides met a total of seven times, Romania's 4-0 victory in a friendly fixture taking place on May 31, 2008 was the biggest defeat Montenegro suffered until a 0-7 defeat against England on November 14, 2019 in the qualifying stage for UEFA Euro 2020.

Romania and Montenegro shared the group in the qualifying stage of the 2018 FIFA World Cup, Montenegro eliminating Romania after a 1-0 victory in Podgorica on September 4, 2017, which mathematically disqualified the Tricolours with two rounds still to be played. The fixture was preceded by a 1-1 draw in Cluj-Napoca exactly one year prior, on September 4, 2016, which was considered "shameful" for the Tricolours.

The two sides met again one year later, in Group 4 of League C of the inaugural season of the UEFA Nations League. The two met on Romanian soil on September 7, 2018 in a 0-0 draw behind closed doors in Ploiești. Romania managed to avenge itself with a 1-0 victory in Podgorica on November 20 of the same year which was enough for a second place but not enough to win the group over mutual neighbour Serbia. Nonetheless, Romania was promoted too as part of the revamp UEFA made on September 16, 2019.

The two sides were drawn together once again in the 2022-23 UEFA Nations League Group 3 of League B. In the first matchday, Montenegro defeated Romania on home soil which was followed by a trashing 3-0 victory, Stefan Mugoša scoring a hattrick and sending Romania to League C of the following edition.

===== Kosovo =====
Romania is a strong supporter of Serbia's territorial integrity and has not recognized the legitimacy of Kosovo's independence from Serbia on 17 February 2008. The two teams met only four times, but all the matches led to problems and antipathy feelings between the two peoples.

====== 2023 match ======
On 12 September 2023, the two teams met in Bucharest for the qualifying stage of UEFA Euro 2024. In the eighteenth minute, the Kosovar players left the pitch in a protest after a bottle was thrown from the Romanian sector, which was combined with the two banners quoting "Basarabia e România” (”Bessarabia is Romania” in Romanian) and ”Kosovo je Srbija” (”Kosovo is Serbia” in Serbian) and the constant pro-Serbia chants of the Romanian extremist fanbase ”Uniți sub Tricolor” (”United under Tricolour”). The match was interrupted for fifty minutes and the Football Federation of Kosovo appealed for a 3–0 victory over Romania because of the incidents, which was turned down by UEFA. Romania won the match 2-0.

====== 2024 matches ======
The two teams have met again in the first leg match in group of League C of the UEFA Nations League, season 2024–25. The match took place on Kosovo's Fadil Vokrri Stadium, on 6 September. Once again, the mutual animosity between the two sides was evident, as during the opening ceremony, the Kosovar fans booed while the Romanian anthem was playing. At the end of the match, after a decisive 3–0 victory for Romania, the Kosovar fans threw various objects at Romania's squad while they were leaving the pitch.

When Romania played against Lithuania on 9 September, Romanian fans chanted anti-Kosovo messages which resulted in a €52,500 fine and a partial closure of Arena Națională for the match against Kosovo the very next month.

Already a tense match after the incidents in Kosovo and Lithuania, the two sides faced each other again in Bucharest. A victory for the hosts would have meant promotion to League B of the competition's next season. Kosovo needed a 3 goals difference victory in order to take Romania's spot before the last matchday, and dominated the match. As the final whistle was approaching, after suffering a tackle, Kosovar player Albion Rrahmani attacked Romanian player Denis Alibec, before both teams began fighting on the pitch, the Danish referee booking three players, two of Kosovo and one of Romania. The Romanians proceeded to take a free kick, a moment again disrupted by the Kosovars as they walked over the Romanian fan sector to engage in a verbal fight with the Romanian fans who allegedly began shouting "Serbia! Serbia!".

In the 97th minute of the match, four minutes after the fight between Alibec and Rrahamni took place, the Kosovars left the pitch despite their manager's plead not to. While leaving the pitch, Kosovo's goalkeeper Arijanet Muric was seen showing the middle finger to the Romanian fans. The Romanian team remained on the pitch for one more hour until the referee suspended the match. Meanwhile, the Kosovar players trashed their changing room, leaked pictures of trash and pizza being posted online. Problems continued even after this, with both delegations almost fighting again in the press conference room.

The match was counted as "abandoned". No matter the final result, Romania was crowned as the group winner after a 4–1 victory against Cyprus three days later, despite the final result still pending. However, on 20 November, five days after the match, UEFA announced that Romania won the match 3–0, but will have to play one match at home without fans and face a €128,000 fine, while Kosovo would also receive a €6,000 fine for forfeiting the match.

=== Kits ===
Romania's kits have been supplied by Spanish company Joma from 2015, which replaced Adidas following a three-decade contract. In 2017, the Romanian Football Federation announced its first brand identity and a new kit; the new emblem references the coat of arms of all five Romanian provinces with the intention to symbolise the unity of Romania. In March 2025, Romanian Football Federation launched a new home and away kit for the 2025–26 World Cup Qualifiers, designed in collaboration with Jean Octavian Popescu.

Kit provider	Period
(Romania) Carier International	1970–1977
(France) Le Coq Sportif	1977–1982
(Germany) Adidas	1982–2015
(Spain) Joma	2015–present

=== Home stadium ===
The Romania national team mainly plays its home games at the Arena Națională in Bucharest, the largest stadium in the country. It opened in 2011 and has a capacity of 55,600 seats. The stadium is a Category 4 venue and hosted the 2012 Europa League final and Euro 2020.

Other games, including friendlies and World Cup and Euro qualifiers, have been played at other venues such as the Steaua Stadium (Bucharest), the Ion Oblemenco Stadium (Craiova), the Cluj Arena (Cluj-Napoca), the smaller Dr. Constantin Rădulescu (Cluj-Napoca), Ilie Oană (Ploiești) and Rapid-Giulești (Bucharest) stadiums.

Romanian national team home stadiums

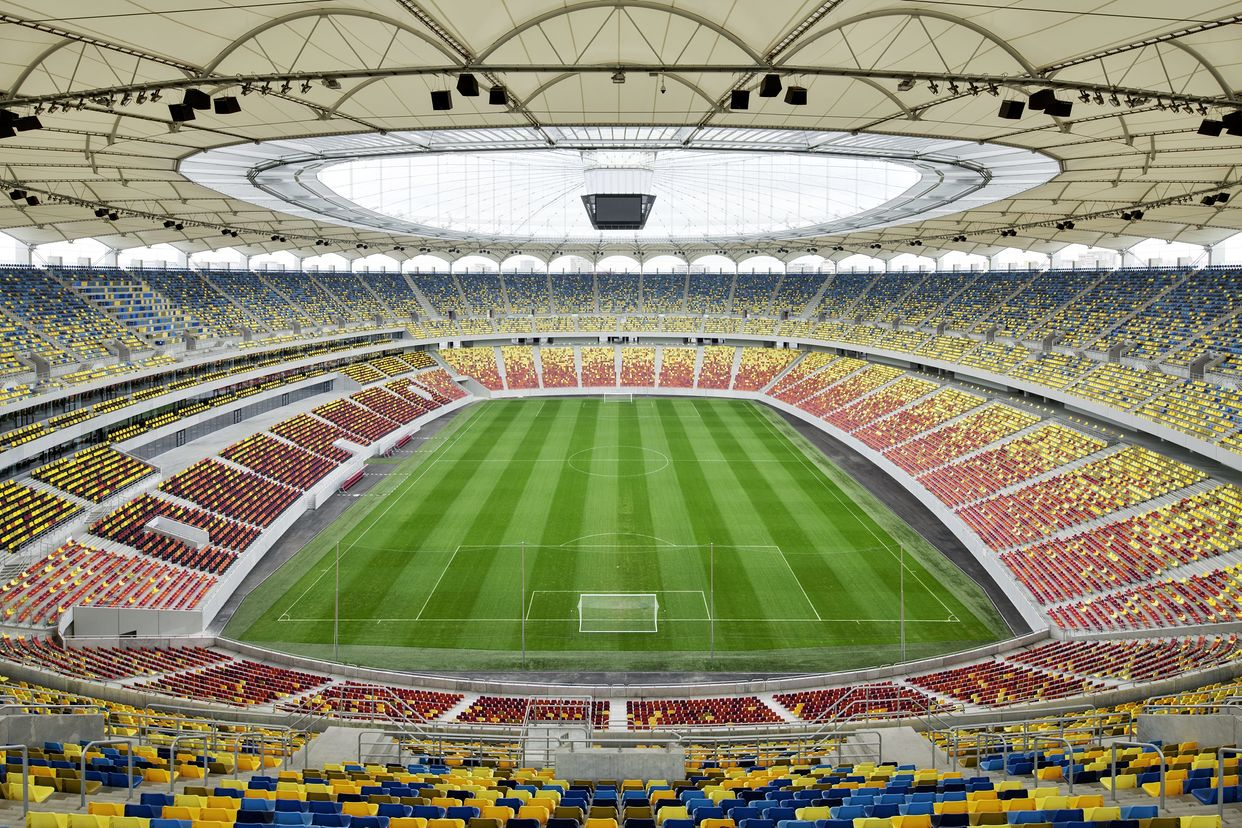
Arena Națională-Bucharest

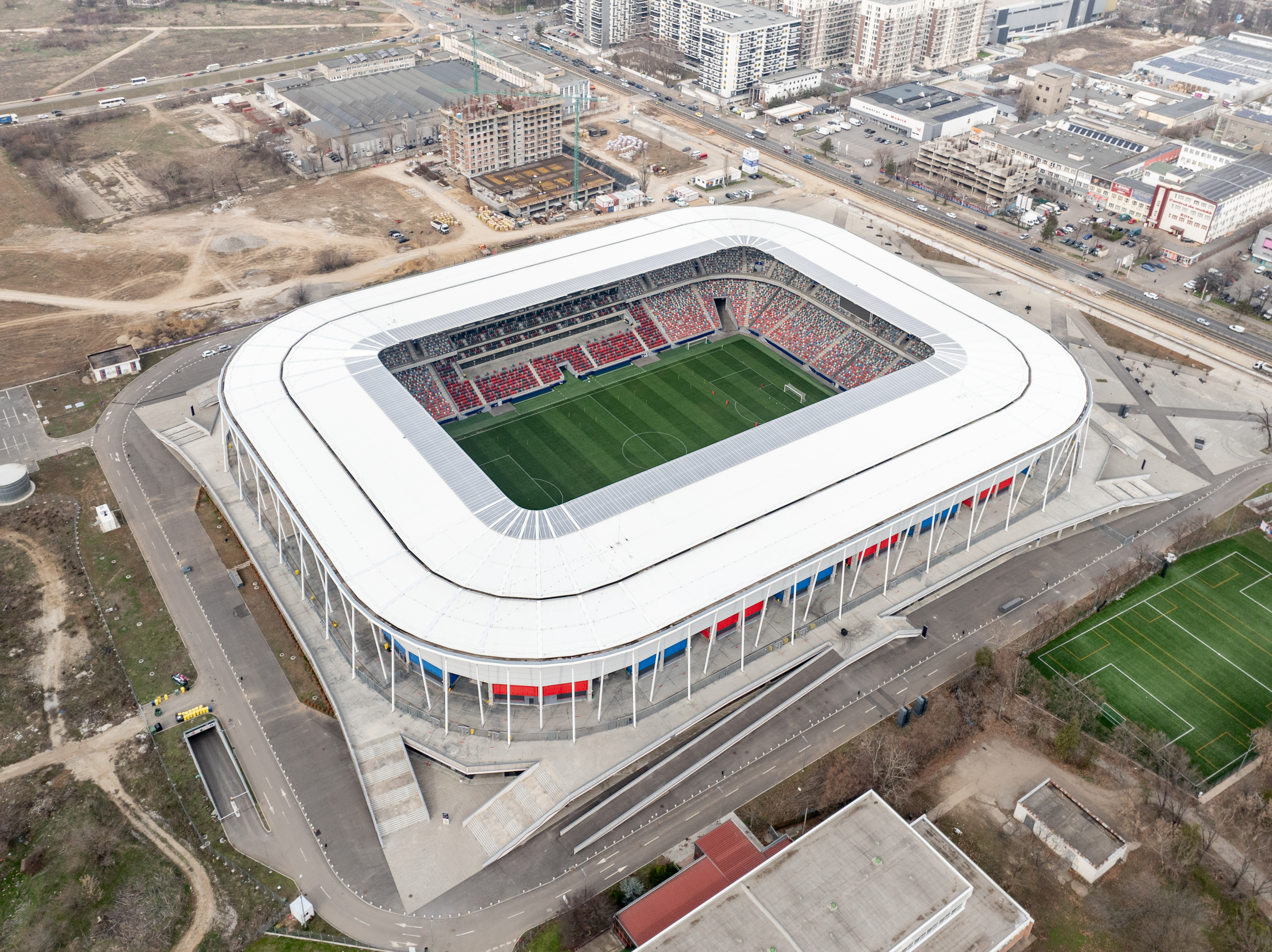
Stadionul Steaua-Bucharest

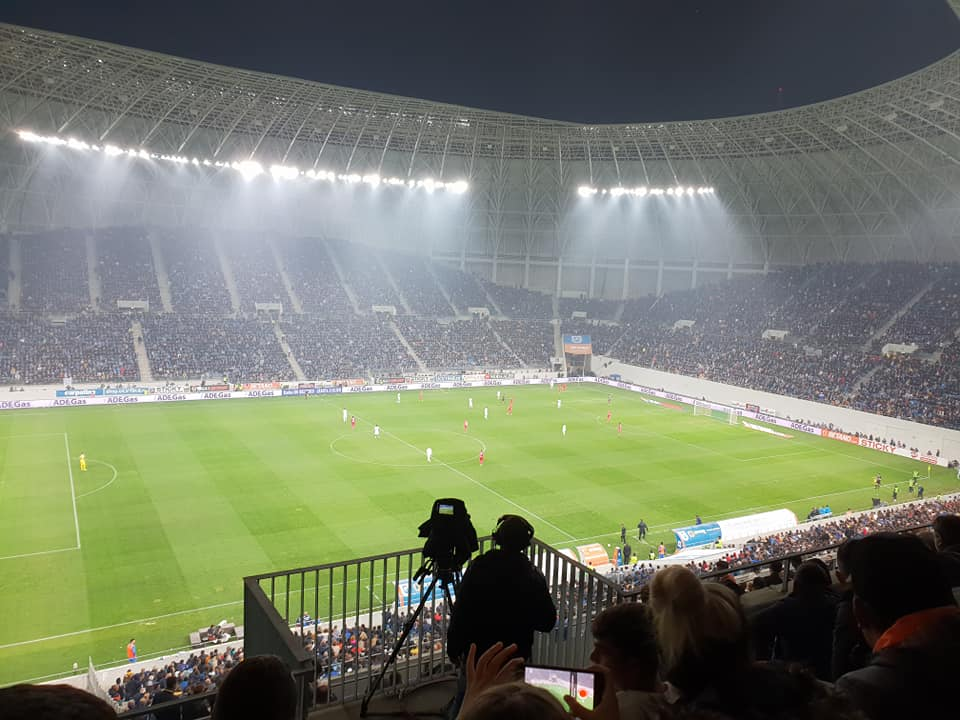
Stadionul Ion Oblemenco-Craiova

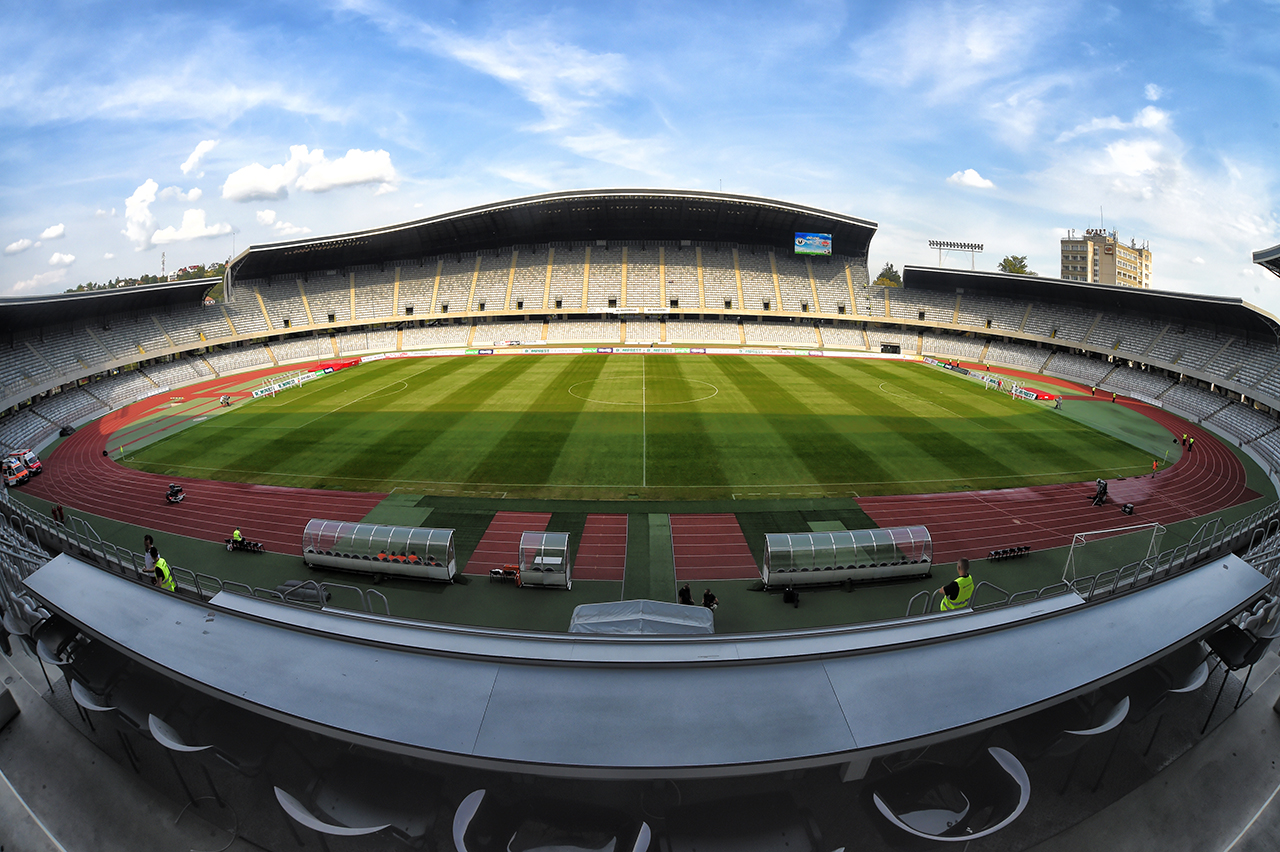
Cluj Arena-Cluj Napoca

=== Media coverage ===
Romania's UEFA Nations League games, major tournament qualifiers and friendlies are to be televised on Pro TV up until 2022. Between 2008 and 2014, Antena 1 had the rights to broadcast the country's home matches, friendlies and qualifiers. From 2014 to 2018, Romania's qualifying matches for the European Championship and the World Cup, plus two pre-Euro and one post-Euro friendly match were taken over by TVR. The friendly matches that were not broadcast by TVR were taken over by Pro TV. In March 2019, the latter took over all broadcasts of Romania's fixtures from TVR, with the effective broadcasting starting in September 2018.

== Results and fixtures ==
The following is a list of match results in the last 12 months, as well as any future matches that have been scheduled.

Win Draw Loss Fixture

=== 2026 ===
26 March 2026 2026 World Cup qualification play-offs	Turkey	1–0	Romania	Istanbul, Turkey
18:00 (20:00 UTC+3)	Kadıoğlu 53'	Report		Stadium: Beşiktaş Stadium; Attendance: 38,979; Referee: François Letexier (France)

31 March 2026 Friendly	Slovakia	2–0	Romania	Bratislava, Slovakia
20:45 UTC+2	Birligea 7' (o.g.); Strelec 46'	Report		Stadium: Tehelné pole Attendance: 8,043; Referee: Ondrej Berka (Czech Republic)

2 June 2026 Friendly	Georgia	1–1	Romania	Tbilisi, Georgia
20:00 UTC+3	Kvilitaia 46'	Report	Munteanu 55'	Stadium: Mikheil Meskhi Stadium; Attendance: 14,702; Referee: Mohammed Al Mazeed (Qatar)

6 June 2026 Friendly	Romania	2–1	Wales	Bucharest, Romania
20:45 UTC+3	Coman 52'; Rus 80'	Report	Brooks 63'	Stadium: Steaua Stadium; Attendance: 23,276; Referee: Rohit Saggi (Norway)

25 September 2026 2026–27 UEFA Nations League	Sweden	2–1	Romania	Solna, Sweden
20:45 UTC+2	Isak 20'; Gyökeres 43'	Report	Man 29'	Stadium: Nationalarenan; Attendance: 31,882; Referee: Ondřej Berka (Czech Republic)

28 September 2026 2026–27 UEFA Nations League	Romania	2–4	Bosnia and Herzegovina	Bucharest, Romania
21:45 UTC+3	Bîrligea 28'; Cicâldău 62'	Report	Gigović 12'; Muharemović 19'; Tabaković 40'; Mahmić 55'	Stadium: Arena Națională; Attendance: 0 Referee: Luis Godinho (Portugal)

2 October 2026 2026–27 UEFA Nations League	Poland	6–0	Romania	Warsaw, Poland
20:45 UTC+2	Lewandowski 24' (pen.), 47', 86'; Ghiță 49' (o.g.); Zieliński 62'; Bednarek 66'	Report		Stadium: Stadion Narodowy; Attendance: 51,054; Referee: Urs Schnyder (Switzerland)

5 October 2026 2026–27 UEFA Nations League	Romania	0–1	Sweden	Bucharest, Romania
21:45 UTC+3		Report	Gyokeres 13'	Stadium: Arena Națională; Attendance: 49,426; Referee: Elchin Masiyev (Azerbaijan)

14 November 2026 2026–27 UEFA Nations League	Romania	2–1	Poland	Bucharest, Romania
21:45 UTC+2	Cicâldău 68'; Man 72'	Report	Reguła 82'	Stadium: Arena Națională; Attendance: 45,827; Referee: Sebastian Gishamer (Austria)

17 November 2026 2026–27 UEFA Nations League	Bosnia and Herzegovina	2–1	Romania	Zenica, Bosnia and Herzegovina
20:45 UTC+1	Tahirović 44'; Bajraktarević 82'	Report	Birgilea 6'	Stadium: Stadion Bilino Polje; Attendance: 11,460; Referee: José María Sánchez Martínez (Spain)

=== 2027 ===
25 or 27 March 2027 2026–27 UEFA Nations League	Estonia	v	Romania	Estonia

28 or 30 March 2027 2026–27 UEFA Nations League	Romania	v	Estonia	Romania

== Coaching staff ==
Role	Name
Head coach	(Romania) Gheorghe Hagi
Assistant Coaches	(Romania) Ionel Gane (Romania) Cătălin Anghel (Romania) Cristian Sava
Goalkeeping Coach	(Romania) Ștefan Preda
Fitness Coach	(Romania) Robert Hodorogea
Video Analysts	(Romania) Vlad Lakatos (Romania) Andrei Butnaraș
Doctor	(Romania) Claudiu Stamatescu
Physiotherapists	(Romania) Toma Vasilescu (Romania) Ovidiu Blendea (Romania) Adrian Gherovăț (Romania) Dragoș Paraschiv (Romania) Alin Burileanu (Romania) Constantin Crețu (Romania) Vivian Negoiță
Head of Performance Analysis	(Romania) Rareș Ene
Nutritionist	(Romania) Gabriel Mărgărit
Team Manager	(Romania) Cătălin Gheorghiu
Kit Manager	(Romania) Cornel Mateiași (Romania) Cătălin Clincea
Technical Director	(Romania) Mihai Stoichiță

=== Coaching history ===
Below is the full list of all former coaches for Romania from 1922 onwards:

- (Romania) Teofil Moraru (1922–1923, 1924–1928)
- (Romania) Costel Rădulescu (1923, 1928–1934, 1935–1938)
- (Romania) Adrian Suciu (1923–1924)
- (Austria) Josef Uridil (1934)
- (Scotland) Peter Farmer (1934–1935)
- (Romania) Alexandru Săvulescu 1938)
- (Romania) Liviu Iuga (1938–1939, 1940)
- (Romania) Virgil Economu (1939–1940, 1941–1942, 1946)
- (Romania) Ion Lăpușneanu (1942)
- (Romania) (Romania) Emerich Vogl (1943, 1947, 1948, 1949, 1950–1952)
- (Romania) Coloman Braun-Bogdan (1945)
- (Romania) (Romania) Colea Vâlcov (1947, 1948, 1949)
- (Romania) Francisc Ronnay (1947)
- (Romania) Petre Steinbach (1948)
- (Romania) Iuliu Baratky (1948)
- (Romania) Ion Mihăilescu (1949)
- (Romania) Gheorghe Albu (1950)
- (Romania) Volodea Vâlcov (1950)
- (Romania) Gheorghe Popescu (1951–1953, 1954–1955, 1961, 1962)
- (Romania) Ștefan Dobay (1953–1954)
- (Romania) Augustin Botescu (1958–1960)
- (Romania) Constantin Teașcă (1962, 1967)
- (Romania) Silviu Ploeșteanu (1962–1963)
- (Romania) Ilie Oană (1965–1966, 1967)
- (Romania) Bazil Marian (1967)
- (Romania) Angelo Niculescu (1967–1971, 1972)
- (Romania) Gheorghe Ola (1972)
- (Romania) Valentin Stănescu (1973–1975, 1980–1981)
- (Romania) Cornel Drăgușin (1975)
- (Romania) Ștefan Kovács (1976–1979, 1980)
- (Romania) Florin Halagian (1979)
- (Romania) Constantin Cernăianu (1979–1980)
- (Romania) (Romania) Mircea Lucescu (1981–1986, 2024–2026)
- (Romania) (Romania) Emerich Jenei (1986–1990, 2000)
- (Romania) Gheorghe Constantin (1990)
- (Romania) Mircea Rădulescu (1990–1992)
- (Romania) Cornel Dinu (1992–1993)
- (Romania) Anghel Iordănescu (1993–1998, 2001–2004, 2014–2016)
- (Romania) Victor Pițurcă (1998–1999, 2005–2009, 2011–2014)
- (Romania) Ladislau Bölöni (2000–2001)
- (Romania) Gheorghe Hagi (2001, 2026–)
- (Romania) Răzvan Lucescu (2009–2011)
- (Germany) Christoph Daum (2016–2017)
- (Romania) Cosmin Contra (2017–2019)
- (Romania) Mirel Rădoi (2019–2021)
- (Romania) Edward Iordănescu (2022–2024)

== Players ==
=== Current squad ===
The following players were named in the squad for the 2026–27 UEFA Nations League matches against Poland and Bosnia and Herzegovina on 14 and 17 November, respectively.
Caps and goals correct as of 17 November 2026, after the match against Bosnia and Herzegovina.

No.	Pos.	Player	Date of birth (age)	Caps	Goals	Club
1	GK	Ștefan Târnovanu	9 May 2000 (age 26)	5	0	(Romanian Football Federation) FCSB
12	GK	Otto Hindrich	5 August 2002 (age 24)	6	0	(Polish Football Association) Legia Warsaw
16	GK	Laurențiu Popescu	18 January 1997 (age 29)	0	0	(Romanian Football Federation) Universitatea Craiova
2	DF	Andrei Rațiu	20 June 1998 (age 28)	43	2	(Royal Spanish Football Federation) Rayo Vallecano
3	DF	Radu Drăgușin	3 February 2002 (age 24)	34	1	(Italian Football Federation) Fiorentina
4	DF	Andrei Coubiș	29 September 2003 (age 23)	9	0	(The Football Association) Lincoln City
5	DF	Virgil Ghiță	4 June 1998 (age 28)	12	1	(German Football Association) Hannover 96
6	DF	Vladimir Screciu	13 January 2000 (age 26)	11	0	(Romanian Football Federation) Universitatea Craiova
13	DF	Matei Ilie	11 December 2002 (age 23)	5	0	(Turkish Football Federation) Kasımpaşa
15	DF	Lisav Eissat	13 January 2005 (age 21)	7	0	(The Football Association) Bristol City
23	DF	Tony Strata	7 September 2004 (age 22)	3	0	(Portuguese Football Federation) Vitória Guimarães
8	MF	Alexandru Cicâldău	8 July 1997 (age 29)	43	6	(Romanian Football Federation) Universitatea Craiova
11	MF	Nicușor Bancu	18 September 1992 (age 34)	56	2	(Romanian Football Federation) Universitatea Craiova
17	MF	Cătălin Cîrjan	1 December 2002 (age 23)	5	0	(Romanian Football Federation) Dinamo București
18	MF	Răzvan Marin	23 May 1996 (age 30)	79	12	(Hellenic Football Federation) AEK Athens
19	MF	Marius Corbu	7 May 2002 (age 24)	2	0	(Hungarian Football Federation) Ferencváros
22	MF	Vlad Dragomir	24 April 1999 (age 27)	13	0	(Cyprus Football Association) Pafos
7	FW	Florinel Coman	10 April 1998 (age 28)	24	3	(Qatar Football Association) Al-Gharafa
9	FW	Daniel Bîrligea	19 April 2000 (age 26)	13	4	(Italian Football Federation) Frosinone
10	FW	Ianis Hagi (captain)	22 October 1998 (age 28)	59	8	(Turkish Football Federation) Alanyaspor
14	FW	Rareș Ilie	19 April 2003 (age 23)	0	0	(Italian Football Federation) Mantova
20	FW	Dennis Man	26 August 1998 (age 28)	50	13	(Royal Dutch Football Association) PSV
21	FW	Olimpiu Moruțan	25 April 1999 (age 27)	20	1	(Romanian Football Federation) Rapid București
	FW	Ianis Stoica	8 December 2002 (age 23)	1	0	(Portuguese Football Federation) Estrela Amadora

=== Recent call-ups ===
The following players have been called up for the team within the last 12 months.

Pos.	Player	Date of birth (age)	Caps	Goals	Club	Latest call-up
GK	Ionuț Radu	28 May 1997 (age 29)	11	0	(Spain) Celta Vigo	v. Sweden, 5 October 2026
GK	Valentin Cojocaru	1 October 1995 (age 31)	0	0	(Poland) Pogoń Szczecin	v. Sweden, 5 October 2026
GK	Marian Aioani	7 November 1999 (age 27)	2	0	(Romania) Rapid București	v. Wales, 6 June 2026
GK	Cătălin Căbuz	18 June 1996 (age 30)	0	0	(Romania) Argeș Pitești	v. Slovakia, 31 March 2026
GK	Mihai Popa	12 October 2000 (age 26)	0	0	(Poland) Motor Lublin	v. Turkey, 26 March 2026 ^{INJ}
DF	Raul Opruț	4 January 1998 (age 28)	5	0	(Romania) Dinamo București	v. Sweden, 5 October 2026
DF	Andrei Burcă	15 April 1993 (age 33)	47	1	(China) Yunnan Yukun	v. Sweden, 5 October 2026
DF	Bogdan Racovițan	6 June 2000 (age 26)	6	0	(Poland) Raków Częstochowa	v. Sweden, 5 October 2026
DF	Andrei Borza	12 November 2005 (age 21)	3	0	(Turkey) Çorum	v. Sweden, 5 October 2026
DF	Deian Sorescu	29 August 1997 (age 29)	25	0	(Turkey) Gaziantep	v. Wales, 6 June 2026
DF	Adrian Rus	18 March 1996 (age 30)	23	2	(Romania) Universitatea Craiova	v. Wales, 6 June 2026
DF	Mihai Popescu	7 May 1993 (age 33)	8	1	(Romania) FCSB	v. Wales, 6 June 2026
DF	Kevin Ciubotaru	2 February 2004 (age 22)	1	0	(Scotland) Dundee United	v. Slovakia, 31 March 2026
MF	Tudor Băluță	27 March 1999 (age 27)	17	0	(Romania) Universitatea Craiova	v. Bosnia and Herzegovina, 17 November 2026 ^{SUS}
MF	Nicolae Stanciu	7 May 1993 (age 33)	90	15	(China) Dalian Yingbo	v. Poland, 14 November 2026 ^{INJ}
MF	David Matei	19 July 2006 (age 20)	3	0	(Romania) Universitatea Craiova	v. Sweden, 5 October 2026
MF	Marius Marin	30 August 1998 (age 28)	36	0	(United Arab Emirates) Al Nasr	v. Sweden, 5 October 2026 ^{INJ}
MF	Claudiu Petrila	7 November 2000 (age 26)	2	0	(Romania) Rapid București	v. Slovakia, 31 March 2026
FW	Valentin Mihăilă	2 February 2000 (age 26)	41	5	(Turkey) Rizespor	v. Poland, 14 November 2026 ^{INJ}
FW	Darius Olaru	3 March 1998 (age 28)	30	0	(Belgium) Union Saint-Gilloise	v. Sweden, 5 October 2026
FW	Florin Tănase	30 December 1994 (age 31)	30	5	(Cyprus) Omonia	v. Sweden, 5 October 2026
FW	Louis Munteanu	16 June 2002 (age 24)	8	3	(United States) D.C. United	v. Poland, 2 October 2026 ^{INJ}
FW	Denis Drăguș	6 July 1999 (age 27)	28	7	(Romania) FCSB	v. Sweden, 25 September 2026 ^{INJ}
FW	Alexandru Dobre	30 August 1998 (age 28)	7	0	(Romania) Rapid București	v. Wales, 6 June 2026
FW	Ștefan Baiaram	31 December 2002 (age 23)	6	1	(Romania) Universitatea Craiova	v. Wales, 6 June 2026
FW	David Miculescu	2 May 2001 (age 25)	8	0	(Romania) FCSB	v. Slovakia, 31 March 2026
FW	Marius Coman	31 July 1996 (age 30)	0	0	(Romania) UTA Arad	v. Slovakia, 31 March 2026
Notes: ^{INJ} = Player withdrew from the squad due to an injury.; ^{RET} = Player who retired from national team.; ^{WD} = Player withdrew from the squad.; ^{SUS} = Player suspended.

== Records ==
As of 5 October 2026
Players in bold are still active with Romania.

=== Most appearances ===
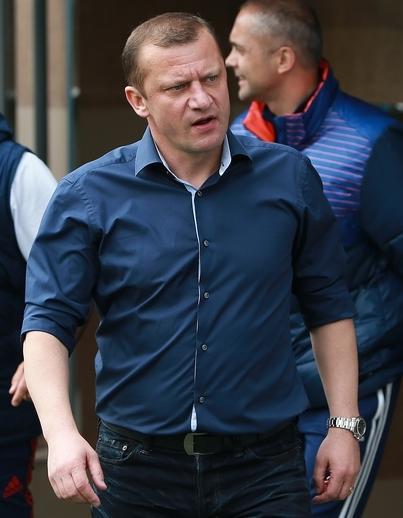
Dorinel Munteanu is Romania's most capped player with 134 appearances.

Rank	Player	Caps	Goals	Career
1	Dorinel Munteanu	134	16	1991–2007
2	Gheorghe Hagi	124	35	1983–2000
3	Gheorghe Popescu	115	16	1988–2003
4	Răzvan Raț	113	2	2002–2016
5	László Bölöni	102	23	1975–1988
6	Dan Petrescu	95	12	1989–2000
7	Bogdan Stelea	91	0	1988–2005
8	**Nicolae Stanciu**	90	15	2016–present
9	Michael Klein	89	5	1981–1991
10	Bogdan Lobonț	86	0	1998–2018

=== Most goals ===
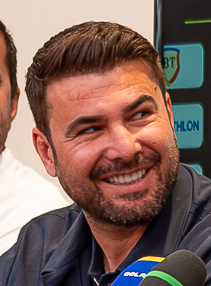
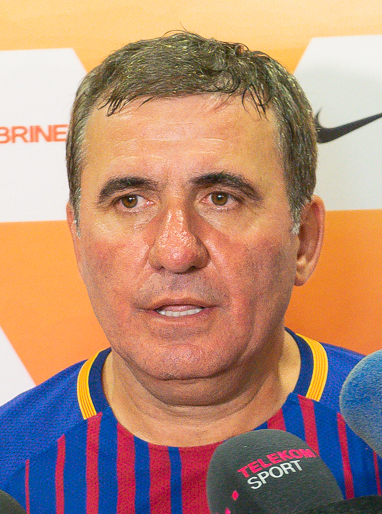
Adrian Mutu and Gheorghe Hagi are Romania's joint top goalscorers with 35 goals each.

Rank	Player	Goals	Caps	Average	Career
1	Adrian Mutu	35	77	0.45	2000–2013
1	Gheorghe Hagi	35	124	0.28	1983–2000
3	Iuliu Bodola	31	48	0.65	1931–1939
4	Viorel Moldovan	25	70	0.36	1993–2005
4	Ciprian Marica	25	72	0.35	2003–2014
6	László Bölöni	23	102	0.23	1975–1988
7	Dudu Georgescu	21	40	0.53	1973–1984
7	Florin Răducioiu	21	40	0.53	1990–1996
7	Anghel Iordănescu	21	57	0.37	1971–1981
7	Rodion Cămătaru	21	73	0.29	1978–1990

=== Youngest debutants ===
As of 15 November 2021
Results list Romania's goal tally first.

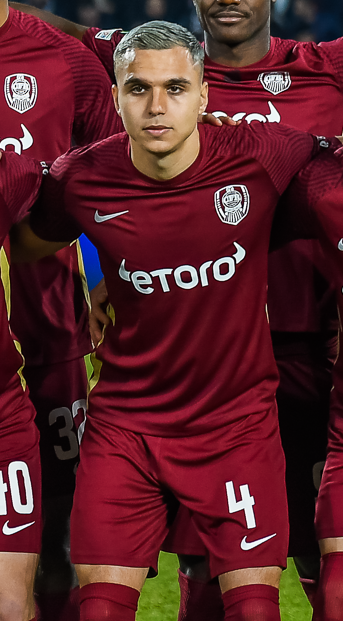
In 2014, Cristian Manea (pictured) broke Grațian Sepi's record from 1928 for being the youngest debutant of Romania. He was surpassed by Enes Sali in 2021.

Rank	Player	Age on debut	Opponent	Result	Year	Ref.
1	**Enes Sali**	15 years, 8 months and 22 days	Liechtenstein	2–0	2021	
2	**Cristian Manea**	16 years, 9 months and 22 days	Albania	1–0	2014	
3	Grațian Sepi	17 years, 3 months and 15 days	Turkey	4–2	1928	
4	Ilie Balaci	17 years, 6 months and 10 days	France	0–1	1974	
5	Nicolae Kovács	17 years, 8 months and 17 days	Bulgaria	3–2	1929	

=== Managers with most matches ===
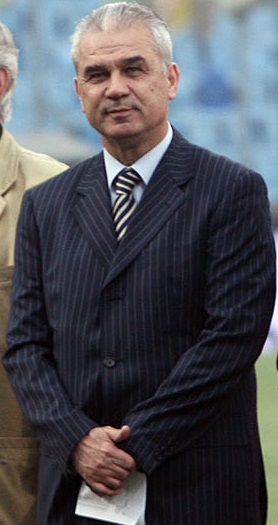
Anghel Iordănescu managed Romania in a record 101 matches.

As of 31 March 2026

Rank	Manager	Matches
1	Anghel Iordănescu	101
2	Victor Pițurcă	95
3	Mircea Lucescu	76
4	Emerich Jenei	51
5	Constantin Rădulescu	49
6	Angelo Niculescu	38
7	Valentin Stănescu	36
8	Ștefan Kovács	34
9	Gheorghe Popescu	28
9	Edward Iordănescu	28

== Competitive record ==
Champions Runners-up Third place

=== FIFA World Cup ===
FIFA World Cup record									Qualification record						
Year	Round	Position	Pld	W	D*	L	GF	GA	Position	Pld	W	D	L	GF	GA
(Uruguay) 1930	Group stage	8th	2	1	0	1	3	5	Qualified as invitees						
(Italy) 1934	Round of 16	12th	1	0	0	1	1	2	2	2	1	1	0	4	3
(France) 1938	Round of 16	9th	2	0	1	1	4	5	Egypt withdrew						
(Brazil) 1950	Did not enter								Declined participation						
(Switzerland) 1954	Did not qualify								2	4	2	0	2	5	5
(Sweden) 1958	Did not qualify								2	4	2	1	1	6	4
(Chile) 1962	Did not qualify								Withdrew						
(England) 1966	Did not qualify								3	6	3	0	3	9	7
(Mexico) 1970	Group stage	10th	3	1	0	2	4	5	1	6	3	2	1	7	6
(West Germany) 1974	Did not qualify								2	6	4	1	1	17	4
(Argentina) 1978	Did not qualify								2	4	2	0	2	7	8
(Spain) 1982	Did not qualify								3	8	2	4	2	5	5
(Mexico) 1986	Did not qualify								3	8	3	3	2	12	7
(Italy) 1990	Round of 16	12th	4	1	2(1*)	1	4	3	1	6	4	1	1	10	5
(United States) 1994	Quarter-finals	6th	5	3	1*	1	10	9	1	10	7	1	2	29	12
(France) 1998	Round of 16	11th	4	2	1	1	4	3	1	10	9	1	0	37	4
(South Korea) (Japan) 2002	Did not qualify								Play-offs	10	5	2	3	12	10
(Germany) 2006	Did not qualify								3	12	8	1	3	20	10
(South Africa) 2010	Did not qualify								5	10	3	3	4	12	18
(Brazil) 2014	Did not qualify								Play-offs	12	6	2	4	21	16
(Russia) 2018	Did not qualify								4	10	3	4	3	12	10
(Qatar) 2022	Did not qualify								3	10	5	2	3	13	8
(Canada) (Mexico) (United States) 2026	Did not qualify								Play-offs	9	4	1	4	19	11
(Morocco) (Portugal) (Spain) 2030	To be determined								To be determined						
(Saudi Arabia) 2034	To be determined								To be determined						
Total 7/23	Quarter-finals	6th	21	8	5	8	30	32	Total	147	76	30	41	257	153

*Denotes draws including knockout matches decided via penalty shoot-out. Normal colour indicates loss.

=== UEFA European Championship ===
UEFA European Championship record									Qualification record						
Year	Round	Position	Pld	W	D	L	GF	GA	Position	Pld	W	D	L	GF	GA
(France) 1960	Did not qualify								Quarter-finals	4	1	0	3	3	7
(Spain) 1964	Did not qualify								Preliminary round	2	1	0	1	3	7
(Italy) 1968	Did not qualify								First round	6	3	0	3	18	14
(Belgium) 1972	Did not qualify								Quarter-finals	9	4	3	2	15	7
(Socialist Federal Republic of Yugoslavia) 1976	Did not qualify								First round	6	1	5	0	11	6
(Italy) 1980	Did not qualify								3	6	2	2	2	9	8
(France) 1984	Group stage	7th	3	0	1	2	2	4	1	8	5	2	1	9	3
(West Germany) 1988	Did not qualify								2	6	4	1	1	13	3
(Sweden) 1992	Did not qualify								3	8	4	2	2	13	7
(England) 1996	Group stage	15th	3	0	0	3	1	4	1	10	6	3	1	18	9
(Belgium) (Netherlands) 2000	Quarter-finals	7th	4	1	1	2	4	6	1	10	7	3	0	25	3
(Portugal) 2004	Did not qualify								3	8	4	2	2	21	9
(Austria) (Switzerland) 2008	Group stage	12th	3	0	2	1	1	3	1	12	9	2	1	26	7
(Poland) (Ukraine) 2012	Did not qualify								3	10	3	5	2	13	9
(France) 2016	Group stage	19th	3	0	1	2	2	4	2	10	5	5	0	11	2
(Europe) 2020	Did not qualify								Play-offs	11	4	2	5	18	17
(Germany) 2024	Round of 16	13th	4	1	1	2	4	6	1	10	6	4	0	16	5
(England) (Scotland) (Republic of Ireland) (Wales) 2028	To be determined								To be determined						
(Italy) (Turkey) 2032	To be determined								To be determined						
Total	Quarter-finals	6/17	20	2	6	12	14	27	Total	136	69	41	26	242	123

*Red border colour indicates tournament was held on home soil.

=== UEFA Nations League ===
UEFA Nations League record
Season	Division	Group	Pld	W	D	L	GF	GA	P/R	RK
2018–19	C	4	6	3	3	0	8	3	▲	32nd
2020–21	B	1	6	2	2	2	8	9	Same position	26th
2022–23	B	3	6	2	1	3	6	8	▼	29th
2024–25	C	2	6	6	0	0	18	3	▲	33rd
2026–27	B	4	6	1	0	5	6	16	TBD	30th
2026–27	B	RPO	0	0	0	0	0	0	TBD	30th
Total			30	14	6	10	46	39	26th	

=== Summer Olympics ===
Football at the Summer Olympics was first played officially in 1908. The Olympiads between 1896 and 1980 were only open for amateur players. The 1984 and 1988 tournaments were open to players with no appearances in the World Cup. After the 1988 Olympics, the football event was changed into a tournament for U23 teams, with a maximum of three older players. See Romania Olympic football team for competition records from 1992 until present day.

Year	Result	Pld	W	D	L	GF	GA
1900 to 1920	Did not enter	—					
(France) 1924	Round of 16	1	0	0	1	0	6
1928 to 1948	Did not qualify	—					
(Finland) 1952	Preliminary round	1	0	0	1	1	2
1956 to 1960	Did not qualify	—					
(Japan) 1964	Quarter-finals	6	4	1	1	12	6
1968 to 1976	Did not qualify	—					
1980 to 1988	Did not enter	—					
Since 1992	See Romania Olympic football team						
Total	3/24	8	4	1	3	13	14

=== Balkan Cup ===
Balkan Cup record
Edition	Result	Pld	W	D	L	GF	GA
1929–31	Champions	6	5	0	1	26	13
1931	Did not enter						
1932	Third place	3	1	0	2	4	5
1933	Champions	3	3	0	0	13	0
1934–35	Third place	3	1	1	1	5	8
1935	Fourth place	3	0	1	2	2	8
1936	Champions	2	2	0	0	9	3
1946	Third place	3	1	1	1	4	4
1947	Third place	4	2	0	2	8	8
1948*	Fourth place	6	2	1	3	6	18
1973–76	Runners-up	4	2	1	1	7	5
1977–80	Champions	6	3	2	1	12	5
Total	4 titles	43	22	7	14	96	77

*Edition abandoned.

== All-time head-to-head record ==
Last match updated was against Bosnia and Herzegovina on 17 November 2026.

Positive record Neutral record Negative record

Country	MP	W	D	L	GF	GA	GD	Win%
Albania	17	11	3	3	41	10	+31	64.71
Algeria	5	1	2	2	7	8	−1	20.00
Andorra	6	6	0	0	21	1	+20	100.00
Argentina	6	1	2	3	5	8	−3	16.67
Armenia	7	5	1	1	15	4	+11	71.43
Australia	1	1	0	0	3	2	+1	100.00
Austria	12	3	5	4	14	14	+0	25.00
Austria Amateurs	2	2	0	0	5	1	+4	100.00
Azerbaijan	4	4	0	0	12	1	+11	100.00
Belarus	7	4	3	0	15	8	+7	57.14
Belgium	13	5	2	6	14	18	−4	38.46
Bolivia	1	1	0	0	3	0	+3	100.00
Bosnia and Herzegovina	10	4	0	6	17	14	+3	40.00
Brazil	3	0	0	3	2	6	−4	0.00
Bulgaria	34	18	7	9	70	49	+21	52.94
Cameroon	1	0	0	1	1	2	−1	0.00
Canada	1	0	0	1	0	3	−3	0.00
Chile	3	3	0	0	9	6	+3	100.00
China	2	2	0	0	5	2	+3	100.00
Colombia	4	2	1	1	6	4	+2	50.00
Congo	1	0	1	0	1	1	+0	0.00
Croatia	4	0	1	3	3	6	−3	0.00
Cuba	2	0	1	1	4	5	−1	0.00
Cyprus	17	12	4	1	45	14	+31	70.59
Czech Republic (Note: Record against Czechoslovakia included.)	31	6	7	18	34	65	−31	19.35
Czechoslovakia Amateurs	3	2	1	0	9	4	+5	66.67
Denmark	11	4	4	3	18	15	+3	36.36
DR Congo	1	0	1	0	1	1	+0	0.00
East Germany	16	5	3	8	23	29	−6	31.25
Ecuador	1	0	0	1	0	3	−3	0.00
Egypt	6	3	2	1	9	7	+2	50.00
England	12	3	6	3	10	11	−1	25.00
Estonia	4	3	0	1	7	2	+5	75.00
Faroe Islands	8	8	0	0	26	2	+24	100.00
Finland	13	9	4	0	30	5	+25	69.23
France	16	3	5	8	16	21	−5	18.75
Georgia	9	5	3	1	21	7	+14	55.56
Germany (Note: Record against West Germany included.)	15	2	3	10	19	41	−22	13.33
Greece	35	18	10	7	70	36	+34	51.43
Honduras	1	1	0	0	3	0	+3	100.00
Hungary	24	5	8	11	26	48	−22	20.83
Hungary Amateurs	2	1	0	1	5	5	+0	50.00
Iceland	5	3	1	1	11	2	+9	60.00
Iran	2	0	2	0	2	2	+0	0.00
Iraq	2	0	2	0	1	1	+0	0.00
Israel	24	12	7	5	36	24	+12	50.00
Italy	17	2	5	10	14	28	−14	11.76
Ivory Coast	1	0	0	1	1	2	−1	0.00
Japan	4	3	1	0	12	3	+9	75.00
Kazakhstan	2	1	1	0	3	1	+2	50.00
Kosovo	4	3	1	0	8	0	+8	75.00
Latvia	5	4	1	0	9	0	+9	80.00
Liechtenstein	7	6	1	0	30	1	+29	85.71
Lithuania	15	14	0	1	29	9	+20	93.33
Luxembourg	6	6	0	0	21	1	+20	100.00
Malta	2	2	0	0	5	0	+5	100.00
Mexico	2	1	0	1	2	2	+0	50.00
Moldova	5	5	0	0	17	3	+14	100.00
Montenegro	7	2	2	3	6	7	−1	28.57
Morocco	3	2	0	1	9	5	+4	66.67
Netherlands	15	1	3	11	3	32	−29	6.67
Nigeria	2	2	0	0	5	0	+5	100.00
North Macedonia	7	5	1	1	14	7	+7	71.43
Northern Ireland	9	2	4	3	9	9	+0	22.22
Norway	14	4	7	3	14	14	+0	28.57
Paraguay	2	1	0	1	3	4	−1	50.00
Peru	5	2	2	1	8	6	+2	40.00
Poland	37	15	15	7	57	60	−3	40.54
Portugal	11	4	2	5	9	11	−2	36.36
Republic of Ireland	5	1	2	2	2	4	−2	20.00
Russia (Note: Record against Soviet Union included.)	11	4	2	5	13	14	−1	36.36
San Marino	5	5	0	0	22	3	+19	100.00
Scotland	6	2	2	2	6	8	−2	33.33
Serbia (Note: Record against Yugoslavia included.)	43	16	7	20	62	75	−13	37.21
Slovakia	13	5	6	2	21	15	+6	38.46
Slovenia	9	3	3	3	14	12	+2	33.33
South Korea	1	1	0	0	2	1	+1	100.00
Spain	18	5	6	7	19	28	−9	27.78
Sweden	13	3	3	7	13	25	−12	23.08
Switzerland	15	6	5	4	19	22	−3	40.00
Trinidad and Tobago	1	1	0	0	4	0	+4	100.00
Tunisia	1	0	1	0	1	1	+0	0.00
Turkey	27	14	7	6	49	25	+24	51.85
Turkmenistan	1	1	0	0	4	0	+4	100.00
Ukraine	7	4	1	2	17	10	+7	57.14
United Arab Emirates	1	0	0	1	1	2	−1	0.00
United States	4	2	1	1	4	4	+0	50.00
Uruguay	5	1	2	2	3	8	−5	20.00
Wales	6	4	1	1	11	8	+3	66.67
Total (89 opponents)	778	343	197	238	1,270	988	+282	44.09

=== FIFA ranking history ===
The following is a chart of yearly averages of Romania's FIFA ranking.

View source data.

== Honours ==
=== Regional ===
- Balkan Cup
  - Champions (4): 1929–31, 1933, 1936, 1977–80
  - Runners-up (1): 1973–76
  - Third place (4): 1932, 1934–35, 1946, 1947

=== Universiade ===
- FISU World University Games
  - Champions (2): 1972, 1974

=== Friendly ===
- Mohammed V Cup
  - Champions (1): 1977
- Tournoi de Paris
  - Champions (1): 1983
- Nehru Cup
  - Champions (1): 1991
- Shanghai International Football Tournament
  - Champions (2): 1991, 1992
- King's Cup
  - Champions (1): 1996
- Cyprus International Football Tournament
  - Champions (3): 2001, 2004, 2006

== See also ==
- Romania Olympic football team
- Romania national under-21 football team
- Romania national under-20 football team
- Romania national under-19 football team
- Romania national under-17 football team
- Romania national futsal team
- Romania national beach soccer team
- Romania women's national football team
- Hungary–Romania football rivalry
