= Jean-Baptiste Troppmann =

French spree killer (1849–1870)

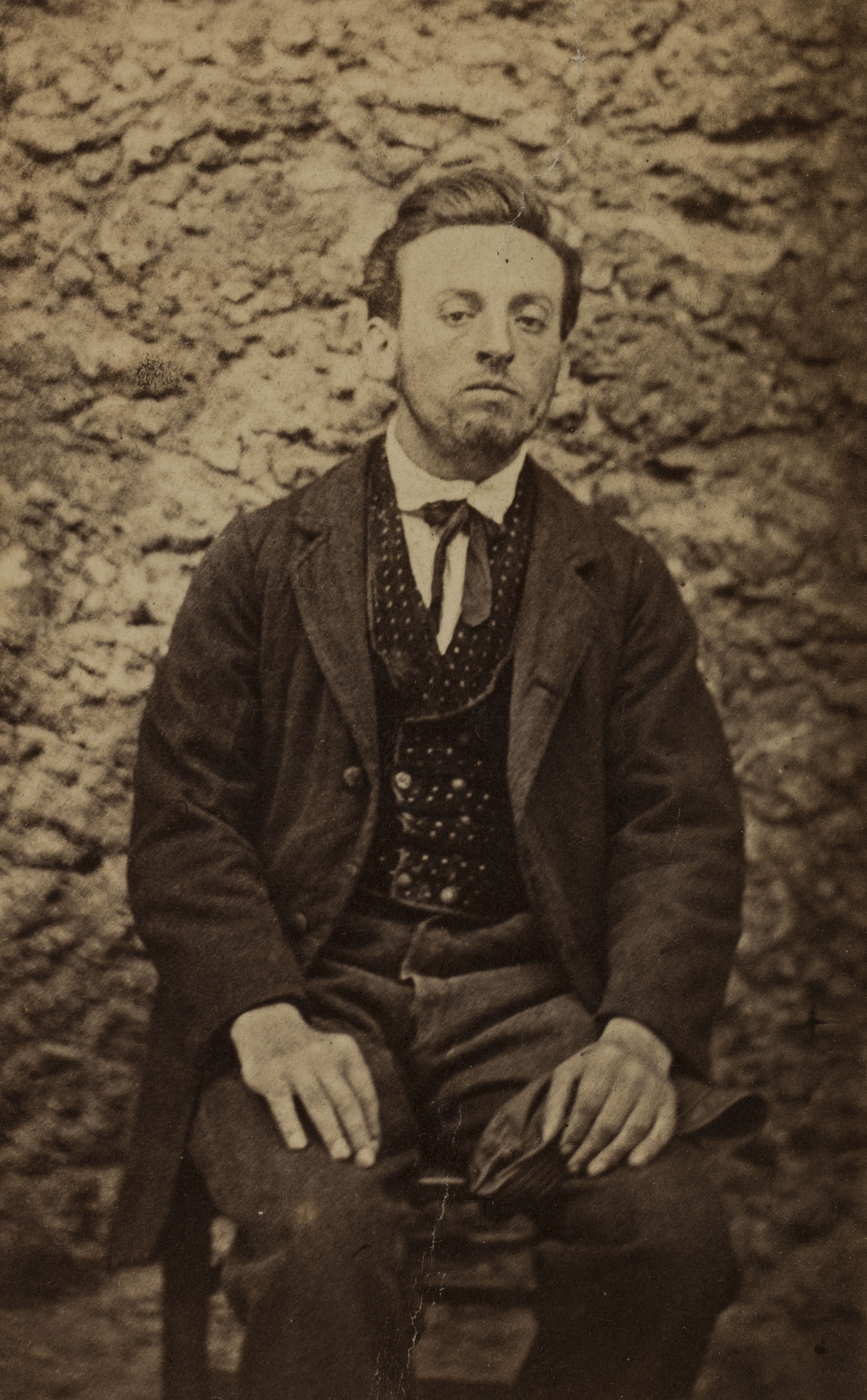
Jean-Baptiste Troppman

Jean-Baptiste Troppmann (5 October 1849 – 19 January 1870) was a French spree killer who murdered eight members of the Kinck family, including six children aged between 2 and 16 years old, at their home in Pantin between 24 August and 19 September 1869. The murders, known as the crime of Pantin or the Pantin massacre, were carried out to gain access to their money. He was caught at the port of Le Havre at the end of September 1869 while attempting to flee the country.

== Conviction and execution ==
Convicted after a three-day trial on 30 December 1869, Troppmann was executed publicly by guillotine outside the gates of La Roquette Prisons on 19 January 1870.

== Impact on the tabloid press ==
His murders, trial, and execution were extensively reported in the French press, and this reporting was a major milestone in the development of the French tabloid press (the petite presse or the presse à un sou). For example, Le Petit Journal, the bestselling newspaper in France, more than doubled its daily circulation, selling 594,000 copies the day of Troppmann's execution.

== Impact on literature ==
The attorney general at Paris, Théodore Grandperret, gained much attention for his indictment of Troppmann. He receives an offhand mention in Mikhail Bakunin's book God and the State, written a few months after his execution, and his execution was witnessed and written about by Ivan Turgenev. A reference is made to Troppman in Rimbaud's sonnet "Paris" written in 1871, and also in Hopscotch by Julio Cortázar. Victor Hugo referred to him as an example of someone whom society perceived as a monster whilst at the same time perceiving the killers of hundreds of thousands as great men in his essay "Pour la Serbie".

== Bibliography ==
- Brumfield, William С. (2014), "Invitation to a Beheading: Turgenev and Troppmann", Informatsionnyi Gumanitarnyi Portal "Znanie. Ponimanie. Umenie" (6), archived from the original on 2 April 2015.
