= Serbophilia =

Love of Serbian culture, language or people

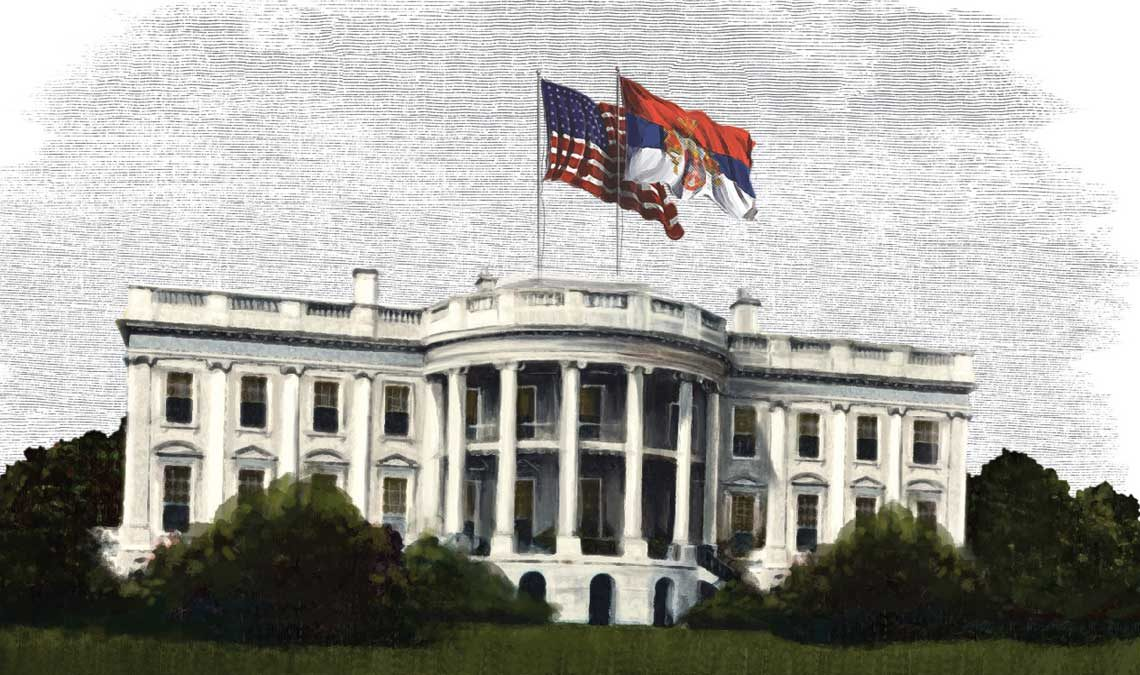
Artistic depiction of a July 1918 event in which a Serbian flag was flown over the White House alongside the United States. one in a show of wartime solidarity; the only non-U.S. flags to have ever been flown over the White House are those of Serbia and France.

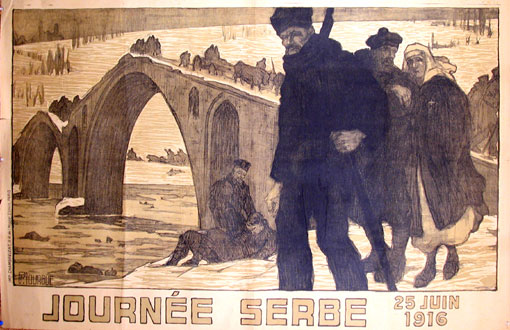
French poster in WWI, 1916

Serbophilia (Serbian: Србофилија, romanized: Srbofilija) is the admiration, appreciation and/or emulation of a non-Serbian person who expresses a strong interest, positive predisposition or appreciation for the Serbs, Serbia, Republika Srpska, Serbian language, culture or history. Its opposite is Serbophobia.

== History ==
=== 20th century ===
==== World War I ====
During World War I, Serbophilia was present in western countries.

==== Breakup of Yugoslavia ====
Political scientist Sabrina P. Ramet writes that Serbophilia in France during the 1990s was "traditional", partly as a response to the closeness between Germany and Croatia. Business ties continued during the war and fostered a desire for economic normalization.

== Serbophiles ==
- Jacob Grimm — German philologist, jurist and mythologist. Learnt Serbian in order to read Serbian epic poetry.
- Archibald Reiss — German-Swiss publicist, chemist, forensic scientist, a professor at the University of Lausanne.
- Victor Hugo — French poet, novelist, and dramatist of the Romantic movement. Hugo wrote the speech Pour la Serbie.
- Alphonse de Lamartine — French author, poet, and statesman.
- Helen of Anjou — French noblewoman who became queen consort of the Serbian Kingdom.
- Mircea I and Vlad III Dracula
- Several notable composers used motifs from Serbian folk music and composed works inspired by Serbian history or culture, such as:
  - Johannes Brahms— German composer, pianist, and conductor of the Romantic period.
  - Franz Liszt — Hungarian composer, virtuoso pianist, conductor, music teacher, arranger, and organist of the Romantic era.
  - Arthur Rubinstein — Polish-American classical pianist.
  - Antonín Dvořák — Czech composer, one of the first to achieve worldwide recognition.
  - Pyotr Ilyich Tchaikovsky — Russian composer of the Romantic period (See Serbo-Russian March).
  - Nikolai Rimsky-Korsakov — Russian composer, and a member of the group of composers known as The Five (See Fantasy on Serbian Themes).
  - Franz Schubert — Austrian composer of the late Classical and early Romantic eras.
  - Hans Huber — Swiss composer. Between 1894 and 1918, he composed five operas.
- Rebecca West (1892–1983) — British travel writer. Was described by American media as having a pro-Serbian stance.
- Flora Sandes — British Irish volunteer in World War I.
- Ruth Mitchell — American volunteer in the Chetniks, World War II. Sister of Billy Mitchell.
- Richard Grenell — American diplomat, public official, and Trump administration official.
- Robert De Niro — American actor
- Johnny Depp — American actor and musician
- John Challis — English actor best known for portraying Terrance Aubrey "Boycie" Boyce in the BBC Television sitcom Only Fools and Horses (1981–2003) and its sequel/spin-off The Green Green Grass (2005–2009)
- Peter Handke — Austrian novelist and playwright, Nobel Prize winner. Supported Serbia in the Yugoslav Wars.
- Eduard Limonov — Russian writer and poet.
- Ángel Pulido — Spanish physician, publicist and politician, who stood out as prominent philosephardite during the Restoration
- Essad Pasha Toptani — Ottoman Albanian politician.
- Anna Dandolo— Venetian noblewoman who became Queen of Serbia.
- Józef Bartłomiej Zimorowic — Polish poet and historian of the Baroque era.
- Adam Jerzy Czartoryski — Polish nobleman, statesman, diplomat and author.
- Pavel Jozef Šafárik — Slovak philologist, poet, literary historian, historian and ethnographer in the Kingdom of Hungary. He was one of the first scientific Slavistics.
- Ján Kollár — Slovak writer (mainly poet), archaeologist, scientist, politician, and main ideologist of Pan-Slavism.
- Ľudovít Štúr — Slovak revolutionary politician and writer.
- Henry Bax-Ironside — British diplomat.
- Eleftherios Venizelos — Greek statesman and a prominent leader of the Greek national liberation movement.
- Dimitrios Karatasos — Greek armatolos who participated in the Greek War of Independence, and several other rebellions, seeking to liberate his native Greek Macedonia.
- Herbert Vivian — British journalist and author of Servia: The Poor Man's Paradise and The Servian Tragedy: With Some Impressions of Macedonia.
- Alexander Kolchak — Imperial Russian admiral, military leader and polar explorer.
- Yu Hua — Chinese author.
- František Zach — Czech soldier and military theorist.
- Viktor Orbán - Prime Minister of Hungary.
- Steve Wozniak - Co-founder of Apple Inc.

== Gallery ==
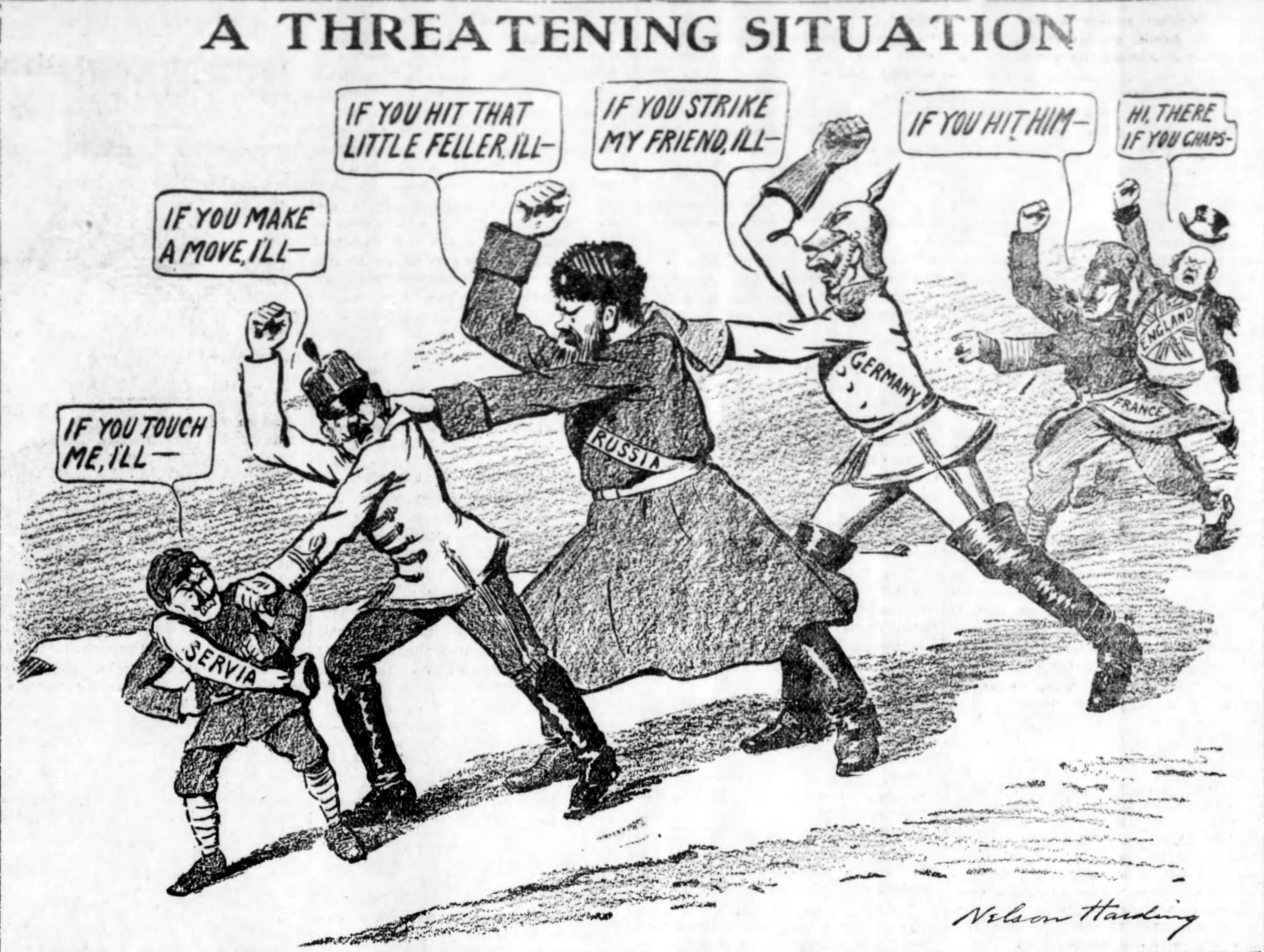
"A Threatening Situation", a comic published in the American newspaper the Brooklyn Eagle in July 1914

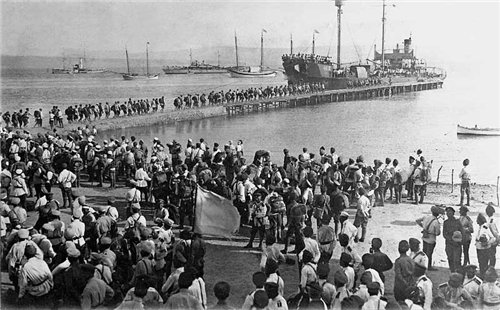
Departure for Serbia

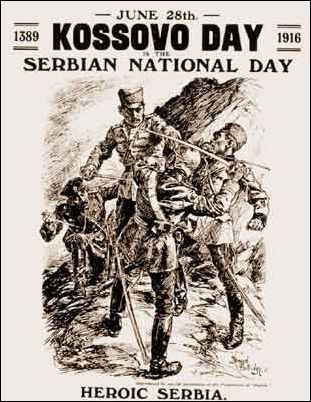
WWI poster - Kosovo Day, June 28, 1916, published in solidarity with the Serb allies

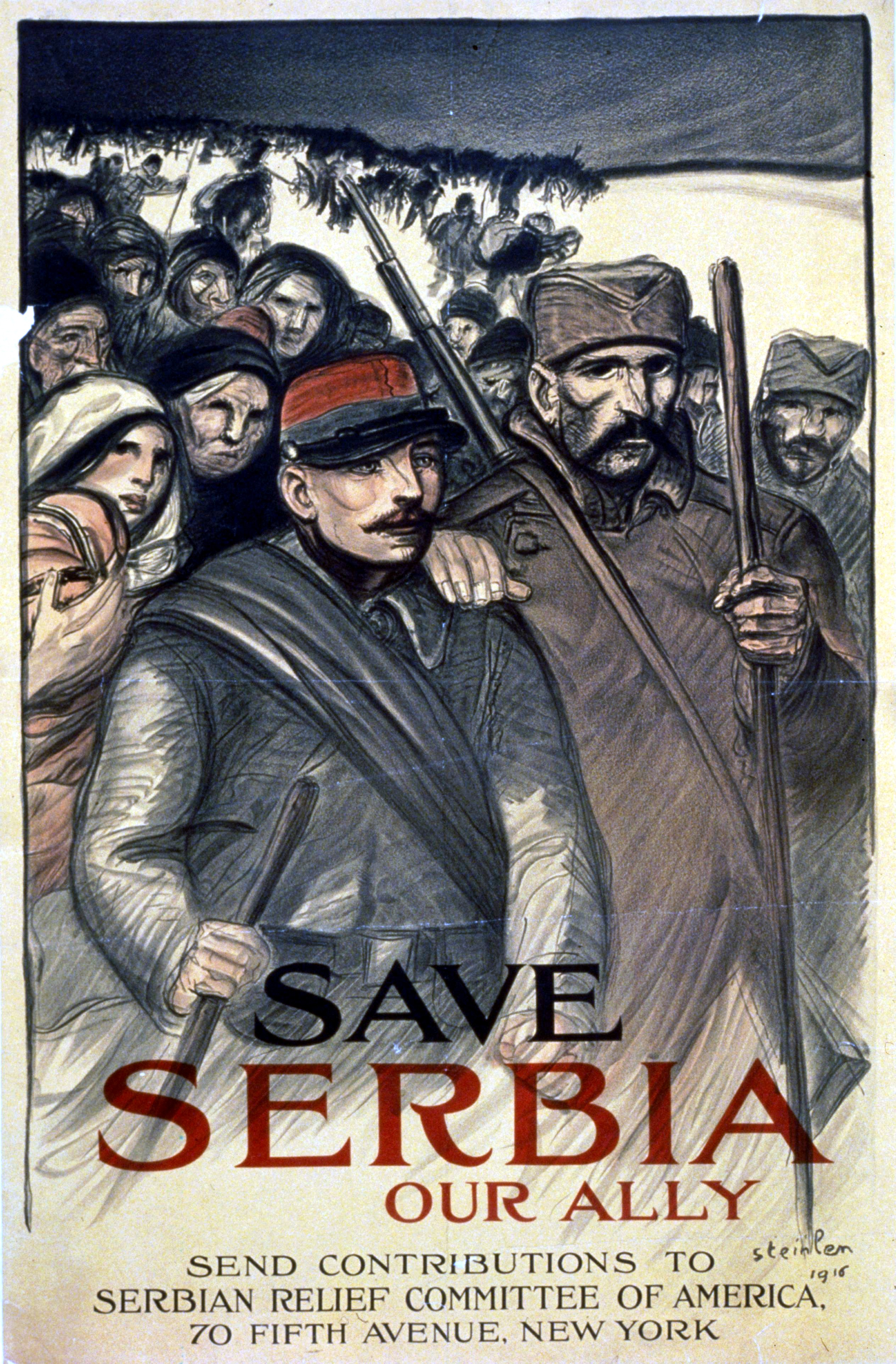
WWI poster - Save Serbia (1915)

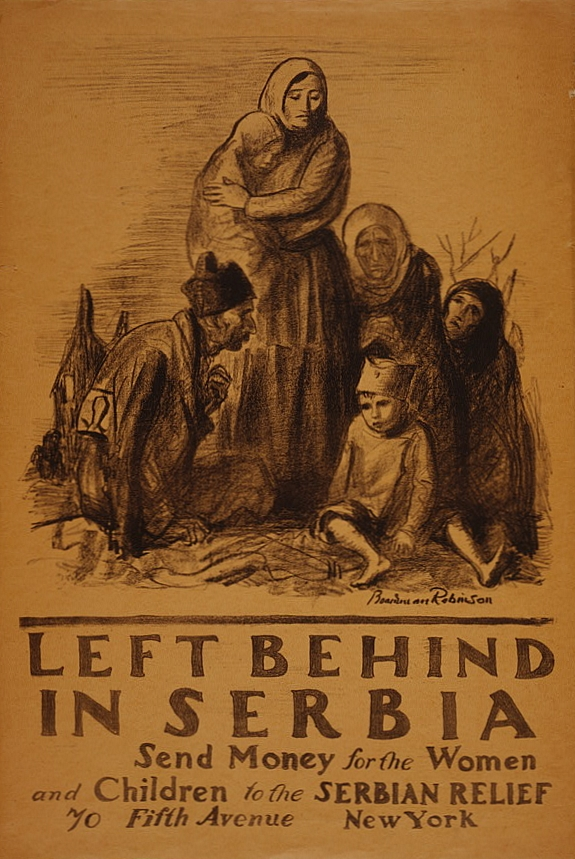
American poster of the Serbian Relief Fund, organised by Mabel Grouitch, asking for donations to help Serbia on the brink of famine.

== See also ==
- Serbian nationalism
- Slavophilia
- Greece–Serbia relations

== Sources ==
- Sells, David (1997). Serb 'Demons' Strike Back (Royal Institute of International Affairs) Vol. 53, No. 2
- Tomić, Dejan (2019). Srbi i evropski kompozitori: srpska muzika i Srbi u delima evropskih kompozitora, od XIX do početka XXI veka [Serbs and European composers: Serbian music and Serbs in the works of European composers, from the 19th to the beginning of the 21st century]. JMU Radio-televizija Srbije. ISBN 978-8-66195-173-2.
