= Pour la Serbie =

1876 speech by Victor Hugo in support of Serbia

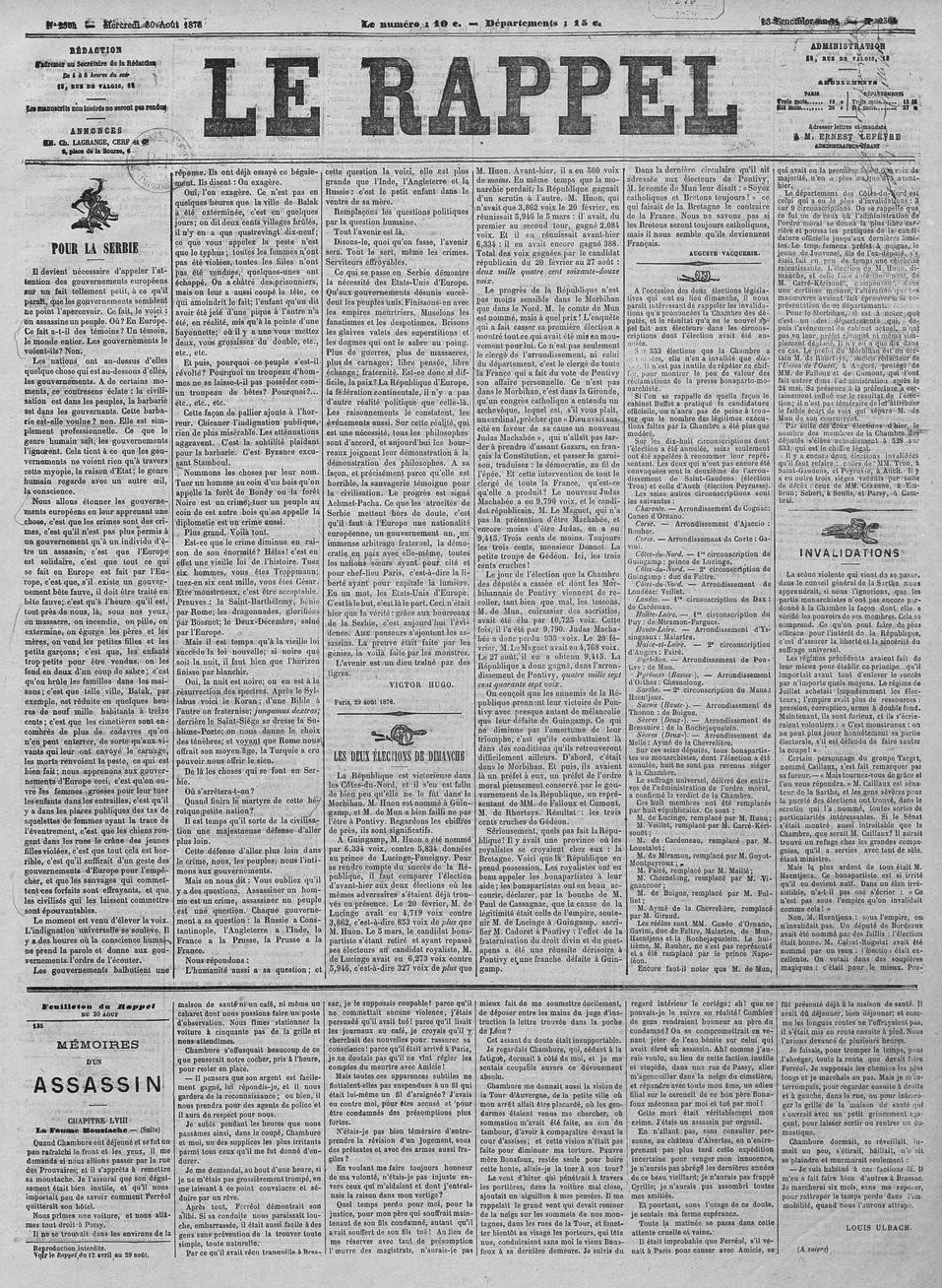
Front page cover of the newspaper Le Rappel of 30 August 1876, with the text "Pour la Serbie", written by Victor Hugo about the massacres committed against the Serbs.

"Pour la Serbie" (For Serbia) is the title of a speech written by Victor Hugo, on 29 August 1876, castigating massacres perpetrated by the Turks in Serbia. It was first published as an open letter in the French newspaper Le Rappel, later included in the last volume of Actes et Paroles, Hugo's collected political writings, entitled Depuis l'exil.

== Content ==
During 1876, the Ottoman harsh suppression of the uprisings of Balkan Christians, specifically, the atrocities in Bulgaria, had been witnessed by Western observers and fully reported in the European press with gruesome details. The Turks had very few regular troops and therefore used irregular Bashi-bazouks who used methods of the utmost violence. When the full extent of the massacres became known, a very strong public reaction against the Ottoman Empire occurred. In this text, Hugo delivers a plea protesting against the impassivity of European governments, in particular in the face of the massacre committed by the Turks in Serbia.

Here is a fact: a nation is being murdered. Where? In Europe. Are there any witnesses? One witness, the whole world. Do governments see it? No.

Hugo's eloquent appeal is calling European governments to take action, and people to raise their voices in universal indignation. This speech is considered as one of the founding acts of the European idea.

What is happening in Serbia demonstrates the necessity for the United States of Europe. May disunited governments be succeeded by united peoples. Let us be finished with murderous empires. Let us muzzle fanaticisms and despotisms. . . No more wars, no more massacres, no more carnage; free-thought; free trade; fraternity...What the atrocities of Serbia place beyond doubt is that Europe needs a European nationality, a single government, an immense fraternal arbitration, democracy at peace with itself... In a word, a United States of Europe. There lies the goal, the haven.

— Victor Hugo, Pour la Serbie (1876),

== See also ==
- Serbian–Turkish Wars (1876–1878)
- Le Rappel
