= Actes et Paroles =

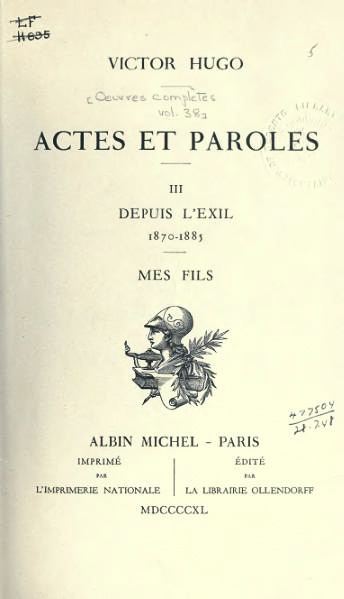
- Depuis l’exil, 1870-1885 cover page
- Author: Victor Hugo
- Original title: Actes et Paroles
- Language: French
- Publisher: J Hetzel
- Publication date: 1880-1926
- Publication place: France

Actes et Paroles (French pronunciation: [akt e paʁɔl], words and deeds) is a collection of Victor Hugo's political utterances from 1841 to 1876. It contains his speeches, largely unchanged, and a record of his political career.

== History ==
This collection of texts was published after the return to France of Hugo, who had gone into exile after Napoleon III coup d'état of December 2, 1851. It is divided into three volumes:

- Avant l'exil, 1841-1851 (before the exile)
- Pendant l'exil, 1852-1870 (during the exile)
- Depuis l'exil, 1870-1876 (since the exile)
