= Yugoslavia national football team results (1920–1941) =

Football events

This is a list of the Yugoslavia national football team games between 1920 and 1941. Between their first match in 1920 and 1941, when competitive football stopped for the Second World War, Yugoslavia played in 109 matches, resulting in 40 victories, 17 draws and 52 defeats. Throughout this period they played in the Balkan Cup six times between 1931 and 1935 with Yugoslavia winning two titles in 1934–35 and 1935, as well as three Olympic Football Tournaments in 1920, 1924 and 1928, with Yugoslavia never going further than the first round. Yugoslavia also qualified through to one FIFA World Cup, the 1930 edition, where they got eliminated in the semi-finals by the hosts and eventual champions Uruguay. Furthermore, they also played in 11 Friendship Cups against Romania, winning 6 and losing 5.

== Kingdom of Serbs, Croats and Slovenes national team ==
During this initial period, the Kingdom played most of its matches with the countries it formed the Little Entente with: Czechoslovakia and Romania.

== 1920s ==
=== 1920 ===
28 August 1920 1920 Summer Olympics First Round	Kingdom of SCS (Kingdom of Yugoslavia)	0–7	Czechoslovakia	Antwerp, Belgium
10:00		Report	Vanik 20', 46', 79'; Janda 34', 50', 75'; Sedláček 43'	Stadium: Stadion Broodstraat; Attendance: 600; Referee: Raphael Van Praag (Netherlands)

3 September 1920 1920 Summer Olympics Consolation first round	Kingdom of SCS (Kingdom of Yugoslavia)	2–4	Egypt	Antwerp, Belgium
10:00	Dubravčić (?); Ružić (?)	Report	Abaza 43' (?); Allouba (?); Hegazi (??)	Stadium: Olympic Stadium; Attendance: 500; Referee: Rafael van Praag (Netherlands)

=== 1921 ===
28 October 1921 Friendly	Czechoslovakia	6–1	(Kingdom of Yugoslavia) Kingdom of SCS	Prague, Czechoslovakia
15:00 (UTC+1:00)	Vanik 59', 63', 78', 86'; Janda 60', 65'	Report	Zinaja 72'	Stadium: Stadion Letná; Attendance: 15,000; Referee: Willem Boas (Netherlands)

=== 1922 ===
8 June 1922 1922 King Alexander's Cup	Kingdom of SCS (Kingdom of Yugoslavia)	1–2	Romania	Belgrade, Yugoslavia
14:00 (UTC+1:00)	Sifer 35'	Report	Rónay 41' (pen.); Guga 61'	Stadium: Stadion SK Jugoslavija; Attendance: 5,000; Referee: Heinrich Retschury (Austria)

28 June 1922 Friendly	Kingdom of SCS (Kingdom of Yugoslavia)	4–3	Czechoslovakia	Zagreb, Yugoslavia
	Ábrahám 45', 70'; Zinaja 63' (pen.), 74'	Report	Dvořáček 16'; Vanik 21'; Plodr 28'	Stadium: Stadion Concordije; Attendance: 8,000; Referee: Alfred Preßler (Austria)
Note: Branko Zinaja set the goal scoring record for Yugoslavia (3 goals)

1 October 1922 Friendly	Kingdom of SCS (Kingdom of Yugoslavia)	1–3	Poland	Zagreb, Yugoslavia
15:15 (UTC+1:00)	Vinek 35'	Report	Kaluza 8', 57'; Garbien 74'	Stadium: Stadion Concordije; Attendance: 4,000; Referee: Heinrich Retschury (Austria)

=== 1923 ===
3 June 1923 Friendly	Poland	1–2	(Kingdom of Yugoslavia) Kingdom of SCS	Kraków, Poland
17:30 (UTC+1:00)	Kaluza 49'	Report	Perska 16'; Zinaja 86'	Stadium: Stadion Cracovii; Attendance: 13,000; Referee: Heinrich Retschury (Austria)
Note: Branko Zinaja set the goal scoring record for Yugoslavia (4 goals)

10 June 1923 1923 King Alexander's Cup	Romania	1–2	(Kingdom of Yugoslavia) Kingdom of SCS	Bucharest, Romania
18:00 (UTC+1:44)	Rónay 47'	Report	Vinek 23', 39'	Stadium: Stadionul F.S.S.R. [Federației Socităților Sportive din România] Attendance: 15,000; Referee: Heinrich Retschury (Austria)

28 October 1923 Friendly	Czechoslovakia	4–4	(Kingdom of Yugoslavia) Kingdom of SCS	Prague, Czechoslovakia
15:00 (UTC+1:00)	Capek 20', 40' (pen.); Stapl 60', 62'	Report 1 Report 2	Petković 4'; Jovanović 9', 15'; Babić 21'	Stadium: Slavia Letná Stadion; Attendance: 15,000; Referee: Eugen Braun (Austria)

=== 1924 ===
10 February 1924 Friendly	Kingdom of SCS (Kingdom of Yugoslavia)	1–4	Austria	Zagreb, Yugoslavia
	Jovanović 56'	Report	Wieser 7', 59', 87'; Hofbauer 55' (pen.)	Stadium: Stadion Concordije; Attendance: 10,000; Referee: Karel Herites (Czechoslovakia)

26 May 1924 1924 Summer Olympics first round	Kingdom of SCS (Kingdom of Yugoslavia)	0–7	Uruguay	Colombes, France
16:00		Report	Vidal 20'; Scarone 23'; Cea 50', 80'; Petrone 35', 61'; Romano 58'	Stadium: Stade Olympique; Attendance: 3,025; Referee: Georges Vallat (France)

28 September 1924 Friendly	Kingdom of SCS (Kingdom of Yugoslavia)	0–2	Czechoslovakia	Zagreb, Yugoslavia
15:30 (UTC+1:00)		Report	Laštovička 54'; Vanik 65'	Stadium: Stadion Concordije; Attendance: 8,000; Referee: Eugen Braun (Austria)

=== 1925 ===
28 October 1925 Friendly	Czechoslovakia	7–0	(Kingdom of Yugoslavia) Kingdom of SCS	Prague, Czechoslovakia
15:00 (UTC+1:00)	Steiner 6' (pen.); Wimmer 24'; Dvořáček 36', 40', 66'; Silny 41'; Šoltys 82'	Report 1 Report 2		Stadium: Slavia Letná Stadion; Attendance: 15,000; Referee: Giovanni Mauro (Italy)

4 November 1925 Friendly	Italy	2–1	(Kingdom of Yugoslavia) Kingdom of SCS	Padua, Italy
14:30 (UTC+1:00)	Schiavio 33', 44'	Report	Benčić 29'	Stadium: Stadio Silvio Appiani; Attendance: 10,000; Referee: Eugen Braun (Austria)

=== 1926 ===
30 May 1926 Friendly	Kingdom of SCS (Kingdom of Yugoslavia)	3–1	Bulgaria	Zagreb, Yugoslavia
	Cindrić 75', 83', 87'	Report	Staykov 23'	Stadium: Maksimir Stadium; Attendance: 6,000; Referee: Gyorgy Gerő (Hungary)

13 June 1926 Friendly	France	4–1	(Kingdom of Yugoslavia) Kingdom of SCS	Paris, France
16:00 (UTC+1:00)	Gallay 16'; Nicolas 17', 37', 61'	Report	Bonačić 25'	Stadium: Stade De Colombes; Attendance: 12,000; Referee: Paul Putz (Belgium)

28 June 1926 Friendly	Kingdom of SCS (Kingdom of Yugoslavia)	2–6	Czechoslovakia	Zagreb, Yugoslavia
	Petković 15'; Giler 19'	Report	Wimmer 16'; Sinly 17', 27', 41', 62'; Puč 43'	Stadium: Stadion Concordije; Attendance: 10,000; Referee: Eugen Braun (Austria)

3 October 1926 1926 King Alexander's Cup	Kingdom of SCS (Kingdom of Yugoslavia)	2–3	Romania	Zagreb, Yugoslavia
15:00 (UTC+1:00)	Percl 47', 49'	Report	Semler 10'; Wetzer 65'; Guga 69'	Stadium: Stadion Concordije; Attendance: 5,000; Referee: Ladislav Štépanovský (Czechoslovakia)

=== 1927 ===
10 April 1927 Friendly	Hungary	3–0	(Kingdom of Yugoslavia) Kingdom of SCS	Budapest, Hungary
16:00 (UTC+1:00)	Siklóssy 24'; Orth 34'; Szabó 90'	Report		Stadium: Üllői úti Stadion; Attendance: 6,000; Referee: Heinrich Retschury (Austria)

10 May 1927 1927 King Alexander's Cup	Romania	0–3	(Kingdom of Yugoslavia) Kingdom of SCS	Bucharest, Romania
17:30 (UTC+1:44)		Report	Luburić 6'; Giler 23'; Bonačić 25'	Stadium: Stadionul ONEF; Attendance: 15,000; Referee: Gerő Ferenc (Hungary)
Note: Biggest victory of the Yugoslavia football team

15 May 1927 Friendly	Bulgaria	0–2	(Kingdom of Yugoslavia) Kingdom of SCS	Sofia, Bulgaria
17:30 (UTC+2:00)		Report	Marjanović 85', 88'	Stadium: Old Slavia Stadium; Attendance: 16,000; Referee: Vasile Nicolaeviciu (Romania)

31 July 1927 Friendly	Kingdom of SCS (Kingdom of Yugoslavia)	1–1	Czechoslovakia	Belgrade, Yugoslavia
17:30 (+1:00)	Perska 35'	Report	Puč 47'	Stadium: Beogradski SK Stadium; Attendance: 12,000; Referee: Mihály Iváncsics (Hungary)

28 October 1927 Friendly	Czechoslovakia	5–3	(Kingdom of Yugoslavia) Kingdom of SCS	Prague, Czechoslovakia
15:00 (+1:00)	Šoltys 1'; Svoboda 19', 68'; Bejbl 23', 36'	Report 1 Report 2	Jovanović 12'; Benčić 48' (pen.); Bonačić 61'	Stadium: Slavia Letná Stadion; Attendance: 15,000; Referee: Mihály Iváncsics (Hungary)

=== 1928 ===
8 April 1928 Friendly	Kingdom of SCS (Kingdom of Yugoslavia)	2–1	Turkey	Zagreb, Yugoslavia
	Jovanović 34'; Giler 35'	Report	Yalınlı 62'	Stadium: Stadion Concordije; Attendance: 5,000; Referee: Mihály Iváncsics (Hungary)

6 May 1928 1928 King Alexander's Cup	Kingdom of SCS (Kingdom of Yugoslavia)	3–1	Romania	Belgrade, Yugoslavia
16:30 (+1:00)	Sotirovic 9', 40'; Marjanović 28'	Report	Possak 85'	Stadium: Beogradski SK Stadium; Attendance: 5,000; Referee: Mihály Iváncsics (Hungary)

29 May 1928 1928 Summer Olympics First Round	Kingdom of SCS (Kingdom of Yugoslavia)	1–2	Portugal	Amsterdam, Netherlands
16:00	Bonačić 40'	Report	Vítor Silva 25'; Augusto Silva 90'	Stadium: Oude Stadion; Attendance: 1,226; Referee: Alfred Birlem (Germany)

27 October 1928 Non-official Friendly	Czechoslovakia	1–2	(Kingdom of Yugoslavia) Kingdom of SCS	Prague, Czechoslovakia
		Report		Stadium: Stadion Letná

28 October 1928 1928 Slavic Tournament	Czechoslovakia	7–1	(Kingdom of Yugoslavia) Kingdom of SCS	Prague, Czechoslovakia
15:00 (UTC+1:00)	Šoltys 11'; Puč 65', 89'; Silny 68', 82'; Bejbl 69', 87'	Report	Beleslin 17'	Stadium: Stadion Letná; Attendance: 15,000; Referee: Eugen Braun (Austria)

=== 1929 ===
10 May 1929 1929 King Alexander's Cup	Romania	2–3	(Kingdom of Yugoslavia) Kingdom of SCS	Bucharest, Romania
18:00 (UTC+1:44)	Subaseanu 20'; Boros 35'	Report	Pavelić 27'; Lemešić 60'; Hitrec 62'	Stadium: Stadionul ONEF; Attendance: 15,000; Referee: Eugen Braun (Austria)

19 May 1929 Friendly	France	1–3	(Kingdom of Yugoslavia) Kingdom of SCS	Colombes, France
15:00 (UTC+1:00)	Cheuva 63'	Report	Hitrec 25'; Marjanović 39'; Lajnert 75'	Stadium: Stade De Colombes; Attendance: 15,000; Referee: Paul Ruoff (Switzerland)

28 June 1929 Friendly	Kingdom of SCS (Kingdom of Yugoslavia)	3–3	Czechoslovakia	Zagreb, Yugoslavia
17:30 (+1:00)	Hitrec 35'; Marjanović 43', 52'	Report	Knobloch-Madelon 30'; Hojer 42'; Silny 67'	Stadium: Stadion Concordije; Attendance: 8,000; Referee: Herbert Frankenstein (Austria)
Note: Blagoje Marjanović set the goal scoring record for Yugoslavia (6 goals)

== Kingdom of Yugoslavia national team ==
=== 1929 ===
6 October 1929 1929–31 Balkan Cup	Romania	2–1	Kingdom of Yugoslavia	Bucharest, Romania
16:00 (UTC+1:44)	Sepi 35'; Ciolac 40'	Report	Marjanović 71'	Stadium: Stadionul ONEF; Attendance: 15,000; Referee: Georgi Grigorov (Bulgaria)
Note: Blagoje Marjanović set the goal scoring record for Yugoslavia (7 goals)

28 October 1929 Friendly	Czechoslovakia	4–3	Kingdom of Yugoslavia	Prague, Czechoslovakia
15:00 (UTC+1:00)	Kloz 2'; Silny 10', 75'; Thaut 69'	Report 1 Report 2	Hitrec 48', 83'; Lajnert 82'	Stadium: Slavia Letná Stadion; Attendance: 8,000; Referee: Emil Göbel (Austria)

=== 1930 ===
26 January 1930 1929–31 Balkan Cup	Greece	2–1	Kingdom of Yugoslavia	Athens, Greece
15:30 (+2:00)	G. Andrianopulos 55'; D. Andrianopulos 59'	Report	Vujadinović 18'	Stadium: Leoforos Alexandras Stadium; Attendance: 15,000; Referee: Nikola Dosev (Bulgaria)

13 April 1930 1929–31 Balkan Cup	Kingdom of Yugoslavia	6–1	Bulgaria	Sofia, Bulgaria
16:00 (+1:00)	Vujadinović 2', 81'; Marjanović 22', 80'; Tirnanić 57'; Hrnjiček 89'	Report	Staykov 35'	Stadium: Old Slavia Stadium; Attendance: 8,000; Referee: Bíró
Note: Biggest victory of the Yugoslavia football team at the time and Blagoje Marjanović set the goal scoring record for Yugoslavia (9 goals)

4 May 1930 1930 King Alexander's Cup	Kingdom of Yugoslavia	2–1	Romania	Belgrade, Yugoslavia
16:00 (UTC+1)	Premerl 12'; Bonačić 32'	Report	Deșu 72'	Stadium: Stadion SK Jugoslavija; Attendance: 8,000; Referee: Ladislav Štépanovský (Czechoslovakia)

15 June 1930 Friendly	Bulgaria	2–2	Kingdom of Yugoslavia	Sofia, Bulgaria
	Stoyanov 16'; Staykov 74'	Report	Tirnanić 57'; Najdanović 87'	Stadium: Levski Field; Attendance: 15,000; Referee: Bíró (Hungary)

14 July 1930 1930 World Cup group stage	Kingdom of Yugoslavia	2–1	Brazil	Montevideo, Uruguay
12:45 UYT (UTC−03:30)	Tirnanić 21'; Bek 30'	Report	Preguinho 62'	Stadium: Estadio Parque Central; Attendance: 24,059; Referee: Aníbal Tejada (Uruguay)

17 July 1930 1930 World Cup group stage	Kingdom of Yugoslavia	4–0	Bolivia	Montevideo, Uruguay
12:45 UYT (UTC−03:30)	Bek 60', 67'; Marjanović 65'; Vujadinović 85'	Report		Stadium: Estadio Parque Central; Attendance: 18,306; Referee: Francisco Mateucci (Uruguay)
Note: Blagoje Marjanović set the goal scoring record for Yugoslavia (10 goals)

27 July 1930 1930 World Cup semi-finals	Uruguay	6–1	Kingdom of Yugoslavia	Montevideo, Uruguay
14:45 UYT (UTC−03:30)	Cea 18', 67', 72'; Anselmo 20', 31'; Iriarte 61'	Report	Vujadinović 4'	Stadium: Estadio Centenario; Attendance: 79,867; Referee: Gilberto de Almeida Rêgo (Brazil)

3 August 1930 Friendly	Argentina	3–1	Kingdom of Yugoslavia	River Plate, Buenos Aires
	Trujillo 25'; Esponda 27', 30'	Report; Report2	Marjanović 42'	Stadium: Estadio Alvear y Tagle; Attendance: 30,000; Referee: Bartolomé Macías (Argentina)
Note: Blagoje Marjanović set the goal scoring record for Yugoslavia (11 goals)

10 August 1930 Alvaro Chaves Unofficial Friendly	Brazil	4–1	Kingdom of Yugoslavia	Rio de Janeiro, Brazil
	Leite (??); Benedicto (??); Russinho (??)	Report; Report2	Bek (??)	Stadium: Estádio Manoel Schwartz

14 August 1930 Unofficial Friendly	Vasco da Gama (Brazil)	6–1	Kingdom of Yugoslavia	Rio de Janeiro, Brazil
	Sant'Anna 9', 33'; Russinho 10', 70', 75'; Mattos 19'	Report	Tirnanić 15'	Stadium: Estádio Vasco da Gama; Referee: Otto Bandusch

16 November 1930 1929–31 Balkan Cup	Bulgaria	0–3	Kingdom of Yugoslavia	Sofia, Bulgaria
15:00 (+2:00)		Report	Lemešić 7'; Marjanović 27'; Praunsperger 78'	Stadium: Old Slavia Stadium; Referee: Jovan Ružić (Yugoslavia)
Note: Blagoje Marjanović set the goal scoring record for Yugoslavia (12 goals)

=== 1931 ===
15 March 1931 1929–31 Balkan Cup	Kingdom of Yugoslavia	4–1	Greece	Belgrade, Yugoslavia
15:00 (+1:00)	Hitrec 35'; Tomašević 52', 75', 83'	Report	Migiakis 52'	Stadium: Beogradski SK Stadium; Attendance: 8,000; Referee: Constantin Rădulescu (Romania)

19 April 1931 1929–31 Balkan Cup	Kingdom of Yugoslavia	1–0	Bulgaria	Belgrade, Yugoslavia
16:15 (+1:00)	Marjanović 21'	Report		Stadium: Beogradski SK Stadium; Attendance: 8,000; Referee: Ernest Fabris (Yugoslavia)

21 May 1931 Friendly	Kingdom of Yugoslavia	3–2	Hungary	Belgrade, Yugoslavia
16:30 (UTC+1:00)	Marjanović 19'; Hitrec 55'; Lemešić 83'	Report	Avar 35', 50'	Stadium: Beogradski SK Stadium; Attendance: 12,000; Referee: Emil Gobel (Austria)
Note: Blagoje Marjanović set the goal scoring record for Yugoslavia (14 goals)

28 June 1931 1929–31 Balkan Cup	Kingdom of Yugoslavia	2–4	Romania	Zagreb, Yugoslavia
17:45 (+1:00)	Zečević 36'; Marjanović 60'	Report	Glanzmann 16'; Bodola 49', 89'; Kovács 50'	Stadium: Stadion Maksimir; Attendance: 8,000; Referee: Apostolos Nikolaidis (Greece)

2 August 1931 Friendly	Kingdom of Yugoslavia	2–1	Czechoslovakia	Belgrade, Yugoslavia
17:30 (+1:00)	Živković 42'; Marjanović 49'	Report	Puč 52'	Stadium: Beogradski SK Stadium; Attendance: 12,000; Referee: John Langenus (Belgium)
Note: Blagoje Marjanović set the goal scoring record for Yugoslavia (16 goals)

2 October 1931 1931 Balkan Cup	Kingdom of Yugoslavia	0–2	Turkey	Sofia, Bulgaria
		Report	Erkal 7'; Arıcan 25'	Stadium: Athletic Park; Attendance: 15,000; Referee: Mihály Iváncsics (Hungary)

4 October 1931 1931 Balkan Cup	Bulgaria	3–2	Kingdom of Yugoslavia	Sofia, Bulgaria
	Lozanov 50'; Angelov 56'; Panchev 86'	Report	Tirnanić 3'; Marjanović 20'	Stadium: Yunak Stadium; Attendance: 15,000; Referee: Mihály Iváncsics (Hungary)
Note: Blagoje Marjanović set the goal scoring record for Yugoslavia (17 goals)

25 October 1931 Friendly	Poland	6–3	Kingdom of Yugoslavia	Poznań, Poland
14:30 (+1:00)	Balcer 4', 12', 51'; Martyna 22'; Kniola 26', 40'	Report	Bek 17'; Hitrec 32', 53'	Stadium: Edmund Szyc Stadium; Attendance: 15,000; Referee: Gustav Krist (Czechoslovakia)

=== 1932 ===
24 April 1932 Friendly	Spain	2–1	Kingdom of Yugoslavia	Oviedo, Spain
16:30	Langara 20'; Regueiro 32'	Report	Vujadinović 27'	Stadium: Buenavista; Attendance: 25,000; Referee: João Tavares de Silva (Portugal)

3 May 1932 Friendly	Portugal	3–2	Kingdom of Yugoslavia	Lisbon, Portugal
17:30 (+1:00)	Pinga 23'; Valadas 42'; Soeiro 65'	Report	Vujadinović 34', 85'	Stadium: Estádio do Lumiar; Attendance: 30,000; Referee: Pedro Escartín Morán (Spain)

29 May 1932 Friendly	Kingdom of Yugoslavia	0–3	Poland	Zagreb, Yugoslavia
17:15 (+1:00)		Report	Nawrot 46', 71'; Ciszewski 52'	Stadium: Gradanskog; Attendance: 6,000; Referee: Gustav Krist (Czechoslovakia)

5 June 1932 Friendly	Kingdom of Yugoslavia	2–1	France	Belgrade, Yugoslavia
17:00 (UTC+1:00)	Glišović 26', 59'	Report	Alcazar 1'	Stadium: Beogradski SK Stadium; Attendance: 12,000; Referee: František Cejnar (Czechoslovakia)

26 June 1932 1932 Balkan Cup	Kingdom of Yugoslavia	7–1	Greece	Belgrade, Yugoslavia
17:30 (+1:00)	Tirnanić 5'; Glišović 15'; Zečević 51', 84'; Živković 51' (pen.), 62' (pen.); Vujadinović 80'	Report	Kitsos 4'	Stadium: Beogradski SK Stadium; Attendance: 10,000; Referee: Denis Xifando (Romania)

30 June 1932 1932 Balkan Cup	Kingdom of Yugoslavia	2–3	Bulgaria	Belgrade, Yugoslavia
17:30 (+1:00)	Živković 84', 89'	Report	Angelov 35'; Peshev 47'; Lozanov 84'	Stadium: Beogradski SK Stadium; Attendance: 6,000; Referee: Stavros Hatzopoulos (Greece)

3 July 1932 1932 Balkan Cup	Kingdom of Yugoslavia	3–1	Romania	Belgrade, Yugoslavia
17:30 (+1:00)	Zečević 21'; Živković 30'; Vujadinović 42'	Report	Kovács 36'	Stadium: Beogradski SK Stadium; Attendance: 8,000; Referee: Stavros Hatzopoulos (Greece)

9 October 1932 Friendly	Czechoslovakia	2–1	Kingdom of Yugoslavia	Prague, Czechoslovakia
15:00 (+1:00)	Puč 4'; Nejedlý 68'	Report	Zečević 38'	Stadium: Stadion Letná; Attendance: 20,000; Referee: Andrzej Rutkowski (Poland)

=== 1933 ===
30 April 1933 Friendly	Kingdom of Yugoslavia	1–1	Spain	Belgrade, Yugoslavia
16:15 (+1:00)	Marjanović 65'	Report	Elícegui 36'	Stadium: Stadion SK Jugoslavija; Attendance: 17,000; Referee: Mihály Iváncsics (Hungary)

7 May 1933 Friendly	Switzerland	4–1	Kingdom of Yugoslavia	Belgrade, Yugoslavia
15:00 (UTC+1:00)	von Kanel 4'; Abegglen 36', 61'; Jäck 78'	Report	Hitrec 21'	Stadium: Stadion SK Jugoslavija; Attendance: 20,000; Referee: Louis Raguin (France)

3 June 1933 1933 Balkan Cup	Kingdom of Yugoslavia	5–3	Greece	Bucharest, Romania
	Kodrnja 12', 20', 72'; Živković 42', 79'	Report	Simeonidis 4'; Raggos 60'; Pierrakos 89'	Stadium: Stadionul ONEF; Attendance: 6,000; Referee: Denis Xifando (Romania)

7 June 1933 1933 Balkan Cup	Kingdom of Yugoslavia	4–0	Bulgaria	Bucharest, Romania
	Kokotović 10', 54', 75'; Živković 22'	Report		Stadium: Stadionul ONEF; Attendance: 5,000; Referee: Stavros Hatzopoulos (Greece)

11 June 1933 1933 Balkan Cup	Romania	5–0	Kingdom of Yugoslavia	Bucharest, Romania
	Bindea 7'; Ciolac 10'; Bodola 13', 35'; Dobay 42'	Report		Stadium: Stadionul ONEF; Attendance: 28,000; Referee: Nikola Dosev (Bulgaria)

6 August 1933 Friendly	Kingdom of Yugoslavia	2–1	Czechoslovakia	Zagreb, Yugoslavia
	Kragić 71'; Kodrnja 77'	Report	Kocsis 54'	Stadium: Stadion Concordije; Attendance: 7,000; Referee: Alois Beranek (Austria)

10 September 1933 Friendly	Poland	4–3	Kingdom of Yugoslavia	Warsaw, Poland
16:00 (+1:00)	Nawrot 10', 46'; Majowski 76'; Król 88'	Report	Vujadinović 29', 41'; Tirnanić 89'	Stadium: Stadion Wojska Polskiego; Attendance: 8,000; Referee: Bohumil Ženišek (Czechoslovakia)

24 September 1933 1934 FIFA World Cup qualification	Kingdom of Yugoslavia	2–2	Switzerland	Belgrade, Yugoslavia
15:30 (+1:00)	Kragić 50'; Marjanović 61'	Report	Frigerio 76'; Jäggi 80'	Stadium: Beogradski SK Stadium; Attendance: 17,000; Referee: Alois Beranek (Austria)

=== 1934 ===
18 March 1934 Friendly	Bulgaria	1–2	Kingdom of Yugoslavia	Sofia, Bulgaria
	Angelov 66'	Report	Marjanović 8', 30'	Stadium: Athletic Park; Attendance: 6,500; Referee: Nikola Dosev (Bulgaria)
Note: Blagoje Marjanović set the goal scoring record for Yugoslavia (21 goals)

1 April 1934 Friendly	Kingdom of Yugoslavia	2–3	Bulgaria	Belgrade, Yugoslavia
16:00 (+1:00)	Kragić 74'; Živković 75'	Report	Angelov 63'; Baikutchev 82', 86'	Stadium: Beogradski SK Stadium; Attendance: 8,000; Referee: Mika Popovic (Yugoslavia)

29 April 1934 1934 FIFA World Cup qualifying	Romania	2–1	Kingdom of Yugoslavia	Bucharest, Romania
17:00 (+3:00)	Schwartz 38'; Dobay 74'	Report	Kragić 71'	Stadium: Stadionul ONEF; Attendance: 20,000; Referee: John Langenus (Belgium)

3 June 1934 Friendly	Kingdom of Yugoslavia	8–4	Brazil	Belgrade, Yugoslavia
17:00 (+1:00)	Stevović 9'; Glišović 23', 62'; Marjanović 50', 76', 80'; Petrak 53'; Tirnanić 78'	Report; Report2	de Brito 6'; Leônidas 8', 35'; Armandinho 48'	Stadium: Beogradski SK Stadium; Attendance: 12,000; Referee: Nikola Dosev (Bulgaria)

26 August 1934 Friendly	Kingdom of Yugoslavia	4–1	Romania	Belgrade, Yugoslavia
16:30 (+1:00)	Sekulić 24', 42', 51'; Marjanović 78'	Report	Wilimowski 54'	Stadium: Stadion SK Jugoslavija; Attendance: 12,000; Referee: Denis Xifando (Romania)
Note: Blagoje Marjanović set the goal scoring record for Yugoslavia (25 goals)

2 September 1934 Friendly	Czechoslovakia	3–1	Kingdom of Yugoslavia	Prague, Czechoslovakia
16:30 (+1:00)	Nejedlý 15'; Sobotka 16'; Junek 20'	Report 1 Report 2	Sekulić 78'	Stadium: Slavia Letná Stadion; Attendance: 15,000; Referee: Mihály Iváncsics (Hungary)

16 December 1934 Friendly	France	3–2	Kingdom of Yugoslavia	Paris, France
14:15 (UTC)	Nicolas 12', 86'; Courtois 88'	Report	Marjanović 44'; Vujadinović 84'	Stadium: Parc des Princes; Attendance: 37,000; Referee: Louis Baert (Belgium)
Note: Blagoje Marjanović set the goal scoring record for Yugoslavia (26 goals)

23 December 1934 1934–35 Balkan Cup	Greece	2–1	Kingdom of Yugoslavia	Athens, Greece
15:00 (+2:00)	Vazos 39'; L. Andrianopoulos 67'	Report	Sekulić 12'	Stadium: Leoforos Alexandras Stadium; Attendance: 18,000; Referee: Constantin Rădulescu (Romania)

25 December 1934 1934–35 Balkan Cup	Kingdom of Yugoslavia	4–3	Bulgaria	Athens, Greece
15:00 (+2:00)	Sekulić 3'; Tomašević 7'; Tirnanić 28', 48'	Report	Peshev 1', 78'; Todorov 23'	Stadium: Leoforos Alexandras Stadium; Attendance: 6,000; Referee: Sotiris Asprogerakas (Greece)

=== 1935 ===
1 January 1935 1934–35 Balkan Cup	Kingdom of Yugoslavia	4–0	Romania	Athens, Greece
15:15 (+2:00)	Tirnanić 10'; Marjanović 34'; Tomašević 67', 83'	Report		Stadium: Leoforos Alexandras Stadium; Attendance: 25,000; Referee: Stavros Hatzopoulos (Greece)

17 June 1935 1935 Balkan Cup	Kingdom of Yugoslavia	2–0	Romania	Sofia, Bulgaria
19:00 (+2:00)	Marjanović 33'; Sekulić 56'	Report; Match abandoned at 0–2 in the 78th minute due to a thunderstorm		Stadium: Yunak Stadium; Attendance: 10,000; Referee: Stavros Hatzopoulos (Greece)

20 June 1935 1935 Balkan Cup	Kingdom of Yugoslavia	6–1	Greece	Sofia, Bulgaria
17:30 (+2:00)	Živković 31', 70'; Marjanović 33'; Vujadinović 49'; Glišović 81', 83'	Report	Baltasis 49'	Stadium: Yunak Stadium; Attendance: 5,000; Referee: Nikola Dosev (Bulgaria)

24 June 1935 1935 Balkan Cup	Bulgaria	3–3	Kingdom of Yugoslavia	Sofia, Bulgaria
	Angelov 25', 28', 66'	Report	Marjanović 2'; Vujadinović 19', 75'	Stadium: Yunak Stadium; Attendance: 25,000; Referee: Stavros Hatzopoulos (Greece)

18 August 1935 Friendly	Poland	2–3	Kingdom of Yugoslavia	Warsaw, Poland
16:30 (+1:00)	Matyas 24'; Peterek 35'	Report	Živković 60', 61'; Sekulić 81'	Stadium: Stadion Wojska Polskiego; Attendance: 12,000; Referee: Alfred Birlem (Germany)

6 September 1935 Friendly	Kingdom of Yugoslavia	0–0	Czechoslovakia	Belgrade, Yugoslavia
15:00 (+1:00)		Report		Stadium: Beogradski SK Stadium; Attendance: 18,000; Referee: Peco Bauwens (Germany)

=== 1936 ===
10 May 1936 1936 King Carol II Cup	Romania	3–2	Kingdom of Yugoslavia	Bucharest, Romania
17:00 (UTC+3:00)	Bodola 21', 46', 51'	Report	Vujadinović 32'; Tomašević 67'	Stadium: Stadionul ONEF; Attendance: 30,000; Referee: John Langenus (Belgium)

12 July 1936 Friendly	Turkey	3–3	Kingdom of Yugoslavia	Istanbul, Turkey
17:45 (+2:00)	Görkey 4'; Sel 42'; Arıcan 82'	Report	Marjanović 15'; Tomašević 35'; Tirnanić 76'	Stadium: Papazın Çayırı; Attendance: 8,000; Referee: Árpád Klein (Hungary)

6 September 1936 Friendly	Kingdom of Yugoslavia	9–3	Poland	Belgrade, Yugoslavia
16:00 (UTC+1:00)	Marjanović 3', 19', 44', 75'; Perlić 11', 61'; Božović 35', 67'; Tirnanić 85'	Report	Peterek 53' (pen.), 78'; Wodarz 80'	Stadium: Beogradski SK Stadium; Attendance: 12,000; Referee: Gustav Krist (Czechoslovakia)

13 December 1936 Friendly	France	1–0	Kingdom of Yugoslavia	Paris, France
14:30	Keller 19'	Report		Stadium: Parc des Princes; Attendance: 32,903; Referee: Rinadlo Barlassina (Italy)

=== 1937 ===
9 May 1937 Friendly	Hungary	1–1	Kingdom of Yugoslavia	Ferencvaros, Hungary
17:00 (+1:00)	Cseh 60'	Report	Lešnik 42'	Stadium: Üllői úti Stadion; Attendance: 16,000; Referee: Rinadlo Barlassina (Italy)

6 June 1937 Friendly	Kingdom of Yugoslavia	1–1	Belgium	Belgrade, Yugoslavia
17:00 (+1:00)	Lešnik 34'	Report	Capelle 52'	Stadium: Beogradski SK Stadium; Attendance: 15,000; Referee: Rinadlo Barlassina (Italy)

1 August 1937 Friendly	Kingdom of Yugoslavia	3–1	Turkey	Belgrade, Yugoslavia
17:00 (+1:00)	Pleše 4'; Božović 55'; Lešnik 79'	Report	Minkari 63'	Stadium: Stadion SK Jugoslavija; Attendance: 8,000; Referee: Rinadlo Barlassina (Italy)

6 September 1937 1937 King Carol II Cup	Kingdom of Yugoslavia	2–1	Romania	Belgrade, Yugoslavia
17:00 (+1:00)	Vujadinović 20'; Lešnik 28'	Report	Baratky 62'	Stadium: Stadion SK Jugoslavija; Attendance: 12,000; Referee: Gustav Krist (Czechoslovakia)

3 October 1937 1937-1938 Eduard Benes Cup	Czechoslovakia	5–4	Kingdom of Yugoslavia	Prague, Czechoslovakia
15:15 (+1:00)	Rulc 5'; Říha 26'; Senecký 43'; Nejedlý 48'; Sobotka 79'	Report	Pleše 18', 50'; Valjarević 60'; Burgr 71' (o.g.)	Stadium: Stadion Letná; Attendance: 18,000; Referee: Alfred Birlem (Germany)

10 October 1937 1938 World Cup qualifying	Poland	4–0	Kingdom of Yugoslavia	Warsaw, Poland
12:00 (+1:00)	Piątek 3', 20'; Wostal 59'; Wilimowski 78'	Report		Stadium: Stadion Wojska Polskiego; Attendance: 30,000; Referee: Lucien Leclercq (France)

=== 1938 ===
3 April 1938 1938 World Cup qualifying	Kingdom of Yugoslavia	1–0	Poland	Belgrade, Yugoslavia
15:30 (+1:00)	Marjanović 61'	Report		Stadium: Beogradski SK Stadium; Attendance: 26,000; Referee: Rinadlo Barlassina (Italy)

8 May 1938 1937-1938 Eduard Benes Cup	Romania	0–1	Kingdom of Yugoslavia	Bucharest, Romania
17:00 (+3:00)	Matošić 28'	Report		Stadium: Stadionul ONEF; Attendance: 25,000; Referee: Pál von Hertzka (Hungary)

22 May 1938 Friendly	Italy	4–0	Kingdom of Yugoslavia	Genova, Italy
16:30 (+1:00)	Colaussi 6'; Piola 12'; Meazza 62' (pen.); Ferrari 84'	Report		Stadium: Stadio Comunale Luigi Ferraris; Attendance: 25,000; Referee: Alfred Birlem (Germany)

29 May 1938 Friendly	Belgium	2–2	Kingdom of Yugoslavia	Brussels, Belgium
15:00 (+1:00)	Capelle 4' van den Wouwer 67'	Report	Petrović 26'; Matošić 77'	Stadium: King Baudouin Stadium; Attendance: 12,076; Referee: Ivan Eklind (Sweden)

28 August 1938 1937–1938 Eduard Benes Cup	Kingdom of Yugoslavia	1–3	Czechoslovakia	Zagreb, Yugoslavia
16:00 (+1:00)	Sipos 56'	Report	Bradáč 19'; Bican 41'; Senecký 69'	Stadium: Stadion Concordije; Attendance: 10,000; Referee: Hans Wüthrich (Switzerland)

6 September 1938 1937–1938 Eduard Benes Cup	Kingdom of Yugoslavia	1–1	Romania	Belgrade, Yugoslavia
16:00 (+1:00)	Petrović 42'	Report	Bindea 69'	Stadium: Beogradski SK Stadium; Attendance: 8,000; Referee: Peco Bauwens (Germany)

25 September 1938 1938 King Piotr II Cup	Poland	4–4	Kingdom of Yugoslavia	Warsaw, Poland
15:30 (+1:00)	Korbas 28'; Wilimowski 36', 84'; Piątek 58'	Report	Velker 44', 62'; Kokotović 51' (pen.); Wölfl 70'	Stadium: Stadion Wojska Polskiego; Attendance: 35,000; Referee: Ivan Eklind (Sweden)

=== 1939 ===
26 February 1939 Friendly	Germany	3–2	Kingdom of Yugoslavia	Berlin, Germany
15:00 (+1:00)	Urban 36'; Janes 57'; Biallas 71'	Report	Petrović 27'; Klodt 38' (o.g.)	Stadium: Berliner Olympiastadion; Attendance: 65,000; Referee: Andrzej Rutkowski (Poland)

7 May 1939 1939 King Carol II Cup	Romania	1–0	Kingdom of Yugoslavia	Bucharest, Romania
17:00 (+3:00)	Dobay 88'	Report		Stadium: Stadionul ONEF; Attendance: 25,000; Referee: Giuseppe Scarpi (Italy)

18 May 1939 Friendly	Kingdom of Yugoslavia	2–1	England	Belgrade, Yugoslavia
17:00 (+1:00)	Glišović 15'; Perlić 62'	Report	Broome 49'	Stadium: Beogradski SK Stadium; Attendance: 40,000; Referee: Georges Capdeville (France)

4 June 1939 Friendly	Kingdom of Yugoslavia	1–2	Italy	Belgrade, Yugoslavia
	Petrović 65'	Report	Piola 35'; Colaussi 61'	Stadium: Beogradski SK Stadium; Attendance: 35,000; Referee: John Langenus (Belgium)

15 October 1939 Friendly	Kingdom of Yugoslavia	1–5	Germany	Zagreb, Yugoslavia
15:00 (+1:00)	Antolković 87'	Report	Schön 8', 66', 72'; Szepan 63', 78'	Stadium: Stadion Concordije; Attendance: 15,000; Referee: Rinaldo Barlassina (Italy)

12 November 1939 Friendly	Kingdom of Yugoslavia	0–2	Hungary	Belgrade, Yugoslavia
14:00 (+1:00)		Report	Sárosi 28'; Tóth 72'	Stadium: Beogradski SK Stadium; Attendance: 18,000; Referee: Hans Wüthrich (Switzerland)

=== 1940 ===
31 March 1940 1940–41 Danube Cup	Romania	3–3	Kingdom of Yugoslavia	Bucharest, Romania
16:45 (+2:00)	Bindea 25', 67'; Baratky 44'	Report	Glišović 12', 60'; Božović 41'	Stadium: Stadionul ONEF; Attendance: 35,000; Referee: Lajos Rubint (Hungary)

14 April 1940 Friendly	Germany	1–2	Kingdom of Yugoslavia	Vienna, Germany
16:30 (+2:00)	Lehner 67'	Report	Glišović 24'; Wölfl 38'	Stadium: Praterstadion; Attendance: 60,000; Referee: Generoso Dattilo (Italy)

22 September 1940 1940 King Alexander's Cup	Kingdom of Yugoslavia	1–2	Romania	Belgrade, Yugoslavia
15:30 (+1:00)	Petrović 17'	Report	Popescu I 41'; Bogdan 51'	Stadium: Beogradski SK Stadium; Attendance: 12,000; Referee: Generoso Dattilo (Italy)
Note: This match between Yugoslavia and Romania also counted for the 1940–41 Danube Cup

29 September 1940 1940–41 Danube Cup	Hungary	0–0	Kingdom of Yugoslavia	Budapest, Hungary
15:30 (+1:00)		Report		Stadium: Üllői úti Stadion; Attendance: 20,000; Referee: Alois Beranek (Austria)

3 November 1940 Friendly	Kingdom of Yugoslavia	2–0	Germany	Zagreb, Yugoslavia
14:30 (+1:00)	Božović 44'; Cimermančić 63'	Report		Stadium: Stadion Concordije; Attendance: 15,000; Referee: Giovanni Scarpi (Italy)

=== 1941 ===
23 March 1941 1940–41 Danube Cup	Kingdom of Yugoslavia	1–1	Hungary	Belgrade, Yugoslavia
15:30 (+1:00)	Glišović 43'	Report	Gyetvai 8'	Stadium: Beogradski SK Stadium; Attendance: 15,000; Referee: Raffaele Scorzoni (Italy)

== See also ==
- Yugoslavia national football team results (1946–69)
- Yugoslavia national football team results (1970–92)
- Croatia national football team results
- Serbia national football team results
