= Romania national football team results (1922–1939) =

Win Draw Loss

The Romania national football team represents Romania in international association football and is controlled by the Romanian Football Federation. Between their first official match in 1922 and 1939, when competitive football stopped for the Second World War, Romania played in 82 matches, resulting in 36 victories, 14 draws and 32 defeats. Throughout this period they played in the Balkan Cup six times between 1931 and 1936 with Romania taking home three titles in 1929–31, 1933 and 1936. Romania also qualified through to three FIFA World Cup's during the 1930s where they got eliminated in the first round in all three attempts with the national team finishing second in their group at the 1930 edition before being eliminated by Czechoslovakia (1934) and Cuba (1938) respectively in the following cups.

== 1922 ==
8 June 1922 1922 King Alexander's Cup	Yugoslavia	1 – 2	Romania	(Kingdom of Yugoslavia) Stadion S.K. Jugoslavija, Belgrade
17:00	Šifer 35' (pen.)	(Report)	41' (pen.) Rónnay; 61' Guga	Attendance: 5,000; Referee: (Austria) Heinrich Retschury

3 September 1922 Friendly	Romania	1 – 1	Poland	(Romania) Stadionul Maccabi, Chernivtsi
	Kozovits 63'	(Report)	20' Duźniak	Attendance: 6,000; Referee: (Austria) Hans Schmidt

== 1923 ==
10 June 1923 1923 King Alexander's Cup	Romania	1 – 2	Yugoslavia	(Romania) Stadionul F.S.S.R., Bucharest
	Rónnay 47'	(Report)	23', 39' Vinek	Attendance: 10,000; Referee: (Austria) Heinrich Retschury

1 July 1923 Friendly	Romania	0 – 6	Czechoslovakia	(Romania) Stadionul Orașului, Cluj
		(Report)	16', 29' Vlček; 50', 66' Sloup; 69', 82' Čapek	Attendance: 8,000; Referee: (Austria) Max Seemann

2 September 1923 Friendly	Poland	1 – 1	Romania	(Poland) Marshal Józef Piłsudski Polish Army Stadium, Lwów
	Kuchar 16'	(Report)	38' Guga	Attendance: 10,000; Referee: (Germany) Carl Koppehel

26 October 1923 Friendly	Turkey	2 – 2	Romania	(Turkey) Taksim Stadium, Istanbul
	Sporel 32', 50'	(Report)	20', 53' Gansl	Attendance: 7,500; Referee: (Czechoslovakia) Anton Krátký

== 1924 ==
20 May 1924 Friendly	Austria	4 – 1	Romania	(Austria) Simmeringer Sportplatz, Wien
	Kanhäuser 2', 52', 85'; Häusler 77'	(Report)	73' Ströck	Attendance: 7,000; Referee: (Germany) Peco Bauwens

27 May 1924 1924 Olympic Games	Netherlands	6 – 0	Romania	(France) Stade Olympique de Colombes, Colombes
	Snouck 8'; Pijl 28', 52', 60', 67' de Natris 80'	(Report)		Attendance: 1,840; Referee: (Switzerland) Félix Herren

31 August 1924 Friendly	Czechoslovakia	4 – 1	Romania	(Czechoslovakia) Stadion Slavii, Prague
	Dvořáček 33'; Kolenatý 35'; Žďárský 58'; Ryšavý 79'	(Report)	85' Semler	Attendance: 18,000; Referee: (Austria) Max Seemann

== 1925 ==
1 May 1925 Friendly	Romania	1 – 2	Turkey	(Romania) Stadionul Romcomit, Bucharest
	Brauchler 66'	(Report)	62' Sporel; 87' Leblebi	Attendance: 15,000; Referee: (England) A. Rolton

31 May 1925 Friendly	Bulgaria	2 – 4	Romania	(Bulgaria) Yunak Stadium, Sofia
	Ivanov 4'; Dimitriev 89'	(Report)	14', 65' Wetzer; 60', 81' (pen.) Semler	Attendance: 10,000; Referee: (Italy) Umberto Marca

== 1926 ==
25 April 1926 Friendly	Romania	6 – 1	Bulgaria	(Romania) Stadionul Romcomit, Bucharest
	Guga 17'; Kugelbauer 24', 44'; Nagy-Csomag 55'; Ströck 62' (pen.); Avar 80'	(Report)	70' Denev	Attendance: 12,000; Referee: (England) A. Rolton

7 May 1926 Friendly	Turkey	1 – 3	Romania	(Turkey) Taksim Stadium, Istanbul
	Peykoğlu 71'	(Report)	54', 63' Semler; 59' Matek	Attendance: 5,000; Referee: (England) W. H. Allen

3 October 1926 1926 King Alexander's Cup	Yugoslavia	2 – 3	Romania	(Kingdom of Yugoslavia) Stadion Concordije, Zagreb
	Percl 47', 49'	(Report)	19' Semler; 65' Wetzer; 69' Guga	Attendance: 5,000; Referee: (Czechoslovakia) Ladislav Štépanovský

== 1927 ==
10 May 1927 1927 King Alexander's Cup	Romania	0 – 3	Yugoslavia	(Romania) Stadionul ONEF, Bucharest
		(Report)	6' Luburić; 23' Giler; 25' Bonačić	Attendance: 10,000; Referee: (Hungary) Ferenc Gerő

19 June 1927 Friendly	Romania	3 – 3	Poland	(Romania) Stadionul ONEF, Bucharest
	Avar 12', 60'; Tänzer 41'	(Report)	51' Kałuża; 64' Pazurek; 76' Wójcik	Attendance: 8,000; Referee: (Czechoslovakia) Ladislav Štépanovský

== 1928 ==
15 April 1928 Friendly	Romania	4 – 2	Turkey	(Romania) Stadionul Gloria C.F.R., Arad
	Wetzer 40'; Uluğ 55' (o.g.); Sepi 68'; Nagy-Csomag 83'	(Report)	18' Faruki; 73' Atak	Attendance: 3,000; Referee: (Kingdom of Yugoslavia) Josip Fabris

6 May 1928 1928 King Alexander's Cup	Yugoslavia	3 – 1	Romania	(Kingdom of Yugoslavia) Stadion Jugoslavija, Belgrade
	Sotirović 7', 42'; Marjanović 26'	(Report)	85' Possak	Attendance: 5,000; Referee: (Hungary) Mihály Ivanicsics

== 1929 ==
21 April 1929 Friendly	Romania	3 – 0	Bulgaria	(Romania) Stadionul ONEF, Bucharest
	Ciolac 64', 71', 73'	(Report)		Attendance: 10,000; Referee: (Hungary) Mihály Ivanicsics

10 May 1929 1929 King Alexander's Cup	Romania	2 – 3	Yugoslavia	(Romania) Stadionul ONEF, Bucharest
	Subășeanu 20'; Boros 35'	(Report)	27' Pavelić; 60' Lemešić; 62' Hitrec	Attendance: 15,000; Referee: (Austria) Eugen Braun

15 September 1929 Friendly	Bulgaria	2 – 3	Romania	(Bulgaria) Levski Field, Sofia
	Staykov 37', 60'	(Report)	30' Sepi; 61' Kovács; 67' Deșu	Attendance: 15,000; Referee: (Hungary) Ferenc Gerő

6 October 1929 1929–31 Balkan Cup	Romania	2 – 1	Yugoslavia	(Romania) Stadionul ONEF, Bucharest
	Sepi 35'; Ciolac 40'	(Report)	71' Marjanović	Attendance: 10,000; Referee: (Bulgaria) Georgi Grigorov

== 1930 ==
4 May 1930 1930 King Alexander's Cup	Yugoslavia	2 – 1	Romania	(Kingdom of Yugoslavia) Stadion Jugoslavija, Belgrade
	Premerl 12'; Bonačić 32'	(Report)	72' Deșu	Attendance: 8,000; Referee: (Czechoslovakia) Ladislav Štépanovský

25 May 1930 1929–31 Balkan Cup	Romania	8 – 1	Greece	(Romania) Stadionul ONEF, Bucharest
	Wetzer 8', 34', 75', 76', 80'; Vogl 43'; Raffinsky 57' (pen.); Dobay 77'	(Report)	15' Andrianopoulos	Attendance: 15,000; Referee: (Kingdom of Yugoslavia) Jovan Ružić

14 July 1930 1930 World Cup group stage	Romania	3 – 1	Peru	(Uruguay) Estadio Pocitos, Montevideo
	Deșu 1'; Stanciu 79'; Kovács 89'	(Report)	75' Ferreira	Attendance: 300; Referee: (Chile) Alberto Warnken

21 July 1930 1930 World Cup group stage	Uruguay	4 – 0	Romania	(Uruguay) Estadio Centenario, Montevideo
	Dorado 7'; Scarone 26'; Anselmo 31'; Cea 35'	(Report)		Attendance: 80,000; Referee: (Brazil) Almeida Rêgo

12 October 1930 1929–31 Balkan Cup	Bulgaria	5 – 3	Romania	(Bulgaria) Slavia Stadium, Sofia
	Staykov 11' (pen.), 52'; Stoyanov 34'; Peshev 47'; Vasilev 50'	(Report)	23', 43' Wetzer; 71' (o.g.) Vasilev	Attendance: 10,000; Referee: (Kingdom of Yugoslavia) Jovan Ružić

== 1931 ==
10 May 1931 1929-31 Balkan Cup	Romania	5 – 2	Bulgaria	(Romania) Stadionul ONEF, Bucharest
	Sepi 25'; Bodola 50', 66'; Stanciu 68', 81'	(Report)	51' Lozanov; 89' Panchev	Attendance: 12,000; Referee: (Kingdom of Yugoslavia) Josip Fabris

28 June 1931 1929-31 Balkan Cup	Yugoslavia	2 – 4	Romania	(Kingdom of Yugoslavia) Stadion H.A.S.K., Zagreb
	Zečević 36'; Marjanović 60'	(Report)	16' Glanzmann; 49', 89' Bodola; 50' Kovács	Attendance: 8,000; Referee: (Greece) Apostolos Nikolaidis

23 August 1931 Friendly	Poland	2 – 3	Romania	(Poland) Stadion Wojska Polskiego, Warsaw
	Nawrot 80'; Wypijewski 87'	(Report)	5', 78' Sepi; 29' Kocsis	Attendance: 10,000; Referee: (Czechoslovakia) František Cejnar

26 August 1931 Friendly	Lithuania	2 – 4	Romania	(Lithuania) Makabi Stadionas, Kaunas
	Raclauskas 34'; Trumpjonas 37'	(Report)	3', 28', 81' Bodola; 58' Sepi	Attendance: 1,000; Referee: (Latvia) Juris Rēdlihs

20 September 1931 1931–1934 Central European Cup for Amateurs	Romania	4 – 1	Czechoslovakia Amateurs	(Romania) Stadionul Carol al-II-lea, Oradea
	Stanciu 19'; Kocsis 28', 87'; Glanzmann 47'	(Report)	35' Nejedlý	Attendance: 8,000; Referee: (Kingdom of Yugoslavia) Bora Vasiljević

4 October 1931 1931–1934 Central European Cup for Amateurs	Hungary Amateurs	4 – 0	Romania	(Hungary) V.A.C. Stadion, Budapest
	Károly 6', 28'; Vogl 60' (o.g.); Engelhardt 68'	(Report)		Attendance: 20,000; Referee: (Kingdom of Yugoslavia) Josip Fabris

29 November 1931 1929-31 Balkan Cup	Greece	2 – 4	Romania	(Greece) Leoforos Alexandras Stadium, Athens
	Aggelakis 34', 39'	(Report)	13', 18', 84' Bodola; 51' Sepi	Attendance: 12,000; Referee: (Kingdom of Yugoslavia) Josip Fabris

== 1932 ==
8 May 1932 1931–1934 Central European Cup for Amateurs	Romania	4 – 1	Austria Amateurs	(Romania) Stadionul ONEF, Bucharest
	Kovács 35'; Kocsis 36', 85'; Bodola 44'	(Report)	17' Sobotka	Attendance: 10,000; Referee: (Hungary) Mihály Ivanicsics

12 June 1932 Friendly	Romania	6 – 3	France	(Romania) Stadionul ONEF, Bucharest
	Bodola 10', 81'; Wetzer 17', 68'; Schwartz 20', 46'	(Report)	63' (pen.) Chardar; 75', 77' Rolhion	Attendance: 10,000; Referee: (Hungary) Mihály Ivanicsics

26 June 1932 1932 Balkan Cup	Bulgaria	2 – 0	Romania	(Kingdom of Yugoslavia) Stadion Beogradski SK, Belgrade
	Peshev 65', 89'	(Report)		Attendance: 5,000; Referee: (Kingdom of Yugoslavia) Mika Popović

28 June 1932 1932 Balkan Cup	Greece	0 – 3	Romania	(Kingdom of Yugoslavia) Stadion Beogradski SK, Belgrade
		(Report)	6' Ciolac; 9' Schwartz; 16' Bodola	Attendance: 2,500; Referee: (Bulgaria) Stefan Chumpalov

3 July 1932 1932 Balkan Cup	Yugoslavia	3 – 1	Romania	(Kingdom of Yugoslavia) Stadion Beogradski SK, Belgrade
	Zečević 21'; Živković 30'; Vujadinović 42'	(Report)	36' Kovács	Attendance: 8,000; Referee: (Greece) Stavros Hatzopoulos

2 October 1932 Friendly	Romania	0 – 5	Poland	(Romania) Stadionul ONEF, Bucharest
		(Report)	5' Matyas; 8', 25', 78' Nawrot; 38' Urban	Attendance: 8,000; Referee: (Kingdom of Yugoslavia) Josip Fabris

16 October 1932 1931–1934 Central European Cup for Amateurs	Austria Amateurs	0 – 1	Romania	(Austria) Linzer A.S.K. Platz, Linz
		(Report)	1' Rónay	Attendance: 4,000; Referee: (Czechoslovakia) Bohumil Ženišek

== 1933 ==
4 June 1933 1933 Balkan Cup	Romania	7 – 0	Bulgaria	(Romania) Stadionul ONEF, Bucharest
	Vâlcov 11', 76'; Dobay 53', 62'; Ciolac 57', 61', 66'	(Report)		Attendance: 15,000; Referee: (Greece) Stavros Hatzopoulos

8 June 1933 1933 Balkan Cup	Romania	1 – 0	Greece	(Romania) Stadionul ONEF, Bucharest
	Dobay 24'	(Report)		Attendance: 15,000; Referee: (Kingdom of Yugoslavia) Josip Fabris

11 June 1933 1933 Balkan Cup	Romania	5 – 0	Yugoslavia	(Romania) Stadionul ONEF, Bucharest
	Bindea 7'; Ciolac 10'; Bodola 13', 40'; Dobay 42'	(Report)		Attendance: 28,000; Referee: (Bulgaria) Nikola Dosev

24 September 1933 1931–1934 Central European Cup for Amateurs	Romania	5 – 1	Hungary Amateurs	(Romania) Stadionul ONEF, Bucharest
	Sepi 8', 32', 47', 83'; Bindea 77'	(Report)	33' Keszey	Attendance: 12,000; Referee: (Bulgaria) Nikola Dosev

29 October 1933 1934 FIFA World Cup qualification	Switzerland	2 – 0	Romania	(Switzerland) Wankdorfstadion, Bern
		(Report)		Attendance: 15,000; Referee: (Netherlands) Hans Samuel Boekman
Note: ROU fielded an ineligible player, so FIFA accordingly awarded SWI a 2–0 win for the match

== 1934 ==
25 March 1934 1931–1934 Central European Cup for Amateurs	Czechoslovakia Amateurs	2 – 2	Romania	(Czechoslovakia) Pardubický Stadion, Pardubice
	Habelt 20'; Kalocsay 83'	(Report)	28' Kovács; 49' Dobay	Attendance: 10,000; Referee: (Poland) Maximilian Sznajder

29 April 1934 1934 FIFA World Cup qualification	Romania	2 – 1	Yugoslavia	(Romania) Stadionul ONEF, Bucharest
	Schwartz 38'; Dobay 74'	(Report)	71' Kragić	Attendance: 20,000; Referee: (Belgium) John Langenus

27 May 1934 1934 FIFA World Cup; Round of 16	Czechoslovakia	2 – 1	Romania	(Italy) Stadio Littorio, Trieste
	Puč 50'; Nejedlý 67'	(Report)	11' Dobay	Attendance: 8,000; Referee: (Belgium) John Langenus

14 October 1934 Friendly	Poland	3 – 3	Romania	(Poland) Marshal Józef Piłsudski Polish Army Stadium, Lviv
	Martyna 12' (pen.), 63' (pen.); Urban 60'	(Report)	52', 86' Dobay; 52' Ciolac	Attendance: 6,000; Referee: (Kingdom of Yugoslavia) Josip Fabris

27 December 1934 1934–35 Balkan Cup	Greece	2 – 2	Romania	(Greece) Leoforos Alexandras Stadium, Athens
	Andrianopoulos 14'; Choumis 75'	(Report)	5' Dobay; 13' Ciolac	Attendance: 15,000; Referee: (Bulgaria) Nikola Dosev

30 December 1934 1934–35 Balkan Cup	Bulgaria	2 – 3	Romania	(Greece) Leoforos Alexandras Stadium, Athens
	Angelov 46', 50'	(Report)	14', 31' Bodola; 37' Ciolac	Attendance: 2,500; Referee: (Greece) Sotiris Asprogerakas

== 1935 ==
1 January 1935 1934–35 Balkan Cup	Romania	0 – 4	Yugoslavia	(Greece) Leoforos Alexandras Stadium, Athens
		(Report)	10' Tirnanić; 34' Marjanović; 67', 83' Tomašević	Attendance: 25,000; Referee: (Greece) Stavros Hatzopoulos

17 June 1935 1935 Balkan Cup	Romania	0 – 2	Yugoslavia	(Bulgaria) Yunak Stadium, Sofia
		(Report)	33' Marjanović; 56' Sekulić	Attendance: 3,000; Referee: (Greece) Stavros Hatzopoulos

19 June 1935 1935 Balkan Cup	Bulgaria	4 – 0	Romania	(Bulgaria) Yunak Stadium, Sofia
	Lozanov 11'; Yordanov 33'; Peshev 49'; Sucitulescu 62' (o.g.)	(Report)		Attendance: 10,000; Referee: (Greece) Stavros Hatzopoulos

24 June 1935 1935 Balkan Cup	Greece	2 – 2	Romania	(Bulgaria) Levski Field, Sofia
	Choumis 10', 15'	(Report)	24' Bodola; 26' Gruin	Attendance: 1,000; Referee: (Bulgaria) Nikola Dosev

25 August 1935 Friendly	Germany	4 – 2	Romania	(Germany) Mitteldeutsche Kampfbahn, Erfurt
	Rasselnberg 1'; Lenz 72'; Simetsreiter 78'; Hohmann 80'	(Report)	15', 77' Vâlcov	Attendance: 35,000; Referee: (Netherlands) Johannes Franciscus van Moorsel

1 September 1935 Friendly	Sweden	7 – 1	Romania	(Sweden) Stockholms Olympiastadion, Stockholm
	Bergsten 17'; Keller 47'; Nilsson 70', 73', 87'; Jonasson 72'; Persson 74'	(Report)	60' Georgescu	Attendance: 20,000; Referee: (Italy) Rinaldo Barlassina

3 November 1935 Friendly	Romania	4 – 1	Poland	(Romania) Stadionul ONEF, Bucharest
	Schileru 1'; Bindea 20', 35'; Sepi 73'	(Report)	36' Pazurek	Attendance: 20,000; Referee: (Kingdom of Yugoslavia) Jovan Ružić

== 1936 ==
10 May 1936 1936 King Carol II Cup	Romania	3 – 2	Yugoslavia	(Romania) Stadionul ONEF, Bucharest
	Bodola 21', 46', 51'	(Report)	32' Vujadinović; 67' Tomašević	Attendance: 30,000; Referee: (Belgium) John Langenus

17 May 1936 1936 Balkan Cup	Romania	5 – 2	Greece	(Romania) Stadionul ONEF, Bucharest
	Bodola 21', 85'; Schwartz 37', 75'; Dobay 77'	(Report)	31' Vazos; 76' Symeonidis	Attendance: 15,000; Referee: (Germany) Peco Bauwens

24 May 1936 1936 Balkan Cup	Romania	4 – 1	Bulgaria	(Romania) Stadionul ONEF, Bucharest
	Schwartz 10', 55'; Ciolac 66'; Dobay 69'	(Report)	35' Angelov	Attendance: 20,000; Referee: (Germany) Peco Bauwens

4 October 1936 Friendly	Romania	1 – 2	Hungary	(Romania) Stadionul ONEF, Bucharest
	Bindea 24'	(Report)	65' Lázár; 83' Toldi	Attendance: 35,000; Referee: (Belgium) John Langenus

== 1937 ==
18 April 1937 1937–1938 Eduard Benes' Cup	Romania	1 – 1	Czechoslovakia	(Romania) Stadionul Regele Carol II, Bucharest
	Bodola 63'	(Report)	81' Nejedlý	Attendance: 40,000; Referee: (Italy) Rinaldo Barlassina

10 June 1937 Friendly	Romania	2 – 1	Belgium	(Romania) Stadionul Regele Carol II, Bucharest
	Barátky 34', 79'	(Report)	87' Voorhoof	Attendance: 30,000; Referee: (Czechoslovakia) Augustin Krist

27 June 1937 Friendly	Romania	2 – 2	Sweden	(Romania) Stadionul Regele Carol II, Bucharest
	Barátky 25', 89'	(Report)	29', 37' Jonasson	Attendance: 25,000; Referee: (Belgium) John Langenus

4 July 1937 Friendly	Poland	2 – 4	Romania	(Poland) Stadion ŁKS, Łódź
	Piontek 2'; Matyas 25'	(Report)	13' Dobay; 14', 82' Barátky; 18' Bodola	Attendance: 20,000; Referee: (Hungary) Klug Frigyes

8 July 1937 Friendly	Lithuania	0 – 2	Romania	Kaunas, Lithuania
		(Report)	17' Bogdan; 88' Bodola	Stadium: Valstybinis Stadionas; Attendance: 5000; Referee: (Estonia) Voldemar Rooks

12 July 1937 Friendly	Latvia	0 – 0	Romania	Rīga, Latvia
		(Report)		Stadium: A.S.K. [Armijas Sporta Klubs] Stadions; Attendance: 8000; Referee: (Czechoslovakia) Gustav Krist

14 July 1937 Friendly	Estonia	2 – 1	Romania	Tallinn, Estonia
	Kaljo 15'; Siimenson 80'	(Report)	69' Bodola	Stadium: Kadrioru Staadion; Attendance: 6000; Referee: (Czechoslovakia) Gustav Krist

6 September 1937 1937 King Carol II Cup	Yugoslavia	2 – 1	Romania	Belgrade, Yugoslavia
	Vujadinović 20'; Lešnik 28'	(Report)	62' Barátky	Stadium: Stadion Beogradski; Attendance: 12,000; Referee: (Czechoslovakia) Gustav Krist

== 1938 ==
8 May 1938 1937–1938 Eduard Benes' Cup	Romania	0 – 1	Yugoslavia	Bucharest, Romania
		(Report)	25' Matošić	Stadium: Stadionul Agenţia Naţională de Educaţie Fizică; Attendance: 35,000; Referee: (Hungary) Hertzka Pál

5 June 1938 FIFA World Cup 1938; Round of 16	Romania	3 – 3 (a.e.t.)	Cuba	Toulouse, France
	Bindea 30'; Barátky 90'; Dobay 106' (e.t.)	(Report)	30' Socorro; 30', 103' (e.t.) Magriñá	Stadium: Stade du T.O.E.C. Attendance: 6,707; Referee: (Italy) Giuseppe Scarpi

9 June 1938 FIFA World Cup 1938; Round of 16 replay	Romania	1 – 2	Cuba	Toulouse, France
	Dobay 35'	(Report) (Report 2)	51' Socorro; 57' Fernández	Stadium: Stade du T.O.E.C. Attendance: 7,536; Referee: (Germany) Alfred Birlem

6 September 1938 1937–1938 Eduard Benes' Cup	Yugoslavia	1 – 1	Romania	Beograd, Yugoslavia
	Petrović 41'	(Report)	67' Bindea	Stadium: Stadion Beogradski; Attendance: 8,000; Referee: (Germany) Peco Bauwens

25 September 1938 Friendly	Romania	1 – 4	Germany	Bucharest, Romania
	Orza 81'	(Report)	13' Schön; 51' Stroh; 61' (o.g.) Albu; 77' Pesser	Stadium: Stadionul Agenţia Naţională de Educaţie Fizică; Attendance: 30,000; Referee: (Kingdom of Yugoslavia) Mika Popović

4 December 1938 1937–1938 Eduard Benes' Cup	Czechoslovakia	6 – 2	Romania	Prague, Czechoslovakia
	Bican 28', 49', 61', 81'; Ludl 38'; Kopecký 78'	(Report)	25' Barátky; 26' Bodola	Stadium: Letenský Stadion; Attendance: 13,000; Referee: (Italy) Generoso Dattilo

== 1939 ==
7 May 1939 1939 King Carol II Cup	Romania	1 – 0	Yugoslavia	Bucharest, Romania
	Dobay 89'	(Report)		Stadium: Stadionul Agenţia Naţională de Educaţie Fizică; Attendance: 25,000; Referee: (Italy) Giuseppe Scarpi

18 May 1939 Friendly	Romania	4 – 0	Latvia	Bucharest, Romania
	Bodola 41', 83'; Dobay 56'; Laumanis 76' (o.g.)	(Report)		Stadium: Stadionul Venus; Attendance: 2,000; Referee: (Poland) Maximilian Sznajder

24 May 1939 Friendly	Romania	0 – 2	England	Bucharest, Romania
		(Report)	10' Goulden; 52' Welsh	Stadium: Stadionul Agenţia Naţională de Educaţie Fizică; Attendance: 40,000; Referee: (Belgium) John Langenus

11 June 1939 Friendly	Romania	0 – 1	Italy	Bucharest, Romania
		(Report)	32' Colaussi	Stadium: Stadionul Agenţia Naţională de Educaţie Fizică; Attendance: 28,000; Referee: (Germany) Alois Beranek

22 October 1939 Friendly	Romania	1 – 1	Hungary	Bucharest, Romania
	Spielmann 78'	(Report)	74' Tóth	Stadium: Stadionul Agenţia Naţională de Educaţie Fizică; Attendance: 25,000; Referee: (Italy) Generoso Dattilo
