= King Alexander's Cup =

King Alexander's Cup (Friendship Cup)
- Founded: 1922
- Abolished: 1940
- Region: Europe (UEFA)
- Teams: 2
- Last champions: Romania (5th title)
- Most championships: Yugoslavia (6 titles)

The King Alexander's Cup (Romanian: Cupa Regelui Alexandru) or Friendship Cup was an international football competition contested by the national teams of Romania and Yugoslavia. The tournament was named after Alexander I, the King of Yugoslavia and was organized to celebrate the wedding of King Alexander I of Yugoslavia with the Princess Maria of Romania, the event being announced by the Romanian newspaper, Ecoul Sportiv on 28 May 1922: "On the occasion of the marriage of His Majesty King Alexander I with Her Royal Highness Princess Maria of Romania, His Majesty was pleased to donate a cup that will bear his name, to encourage the progress of the football-association sport in his country and in the country of his wife. This cup will be a challenge and will go definitely to the country which will win it three times in a row or five times in total." The 1936, 1937 and 1939 editions were called King Carol's Cup, after Carol II of Romania and the last edition was called King Mihai Cup named after Mihai of Romania. Between 1937 and 1938, the regular Friendship Cup played between Romania and Yugoslavia was extended to include Czechoslovakia for a mini tournament called Eduard Benes' Cup named after Edvard Beneš, the president of Czechoslovakia.

== Results ==
=== 1922 ===
8 June 1922
14:00 (UTC+1)

Yugoslavia	1–2	Romania
Šifer 35' (pen.)	Report	Rónay 41' (pen.); Guga 61'

Stadion S.K. Jugoslavija, Belgrade, Kingdom of Yugoslavia
Attendance: 5,000
Referee: Heinrich Retschury (Austria)

=== 1923 ===
10 June 1923
18:00 (UTC+2)

Romania	1–2	Yugoslavia
Rónay 47'	Report	Vinek 23', 39'

Stadionul F.S.S.R., Bucharest, Romania
Attendance: 10,000
Referee: Heinrich Retschury (Austria)

=== 1926 ===
3 October 1926
15:00 (UTC+1)

Yugoslavia	2–3	Romania
Percl 47', 49'	Report	Semler 19'; Wetzer 65'; Guga 69'

Stadion Concordije, Zagreb, Kingdom of Yugoslavia
Attendance: 5,000
Referee: Ladislav Štépanovský (Czechoslovakia)

=== 1927 ===
10 May 1927
17:30 (UTC+2)

Romania	0–3	Yugoslavia
	Report	Luburić 6'; Giler 23'; Bonačić 25'

Stadionul Oficiul Naţional de Educaţie Fizică, Bucharest, Romania
Attendance: 15,000
Referee: Gerő Ferenc (Hungary)

=== 1928 ===
6 May 1928
16:30 (UTC+1)

Yugoslavia	3–1	Romania
Sotirović 7', 42'; Marjanović 26'	Report	Possak 85'

Stadion S.K. Jugoslavija, Belgrade, Kingdom of Yugoslavia
Attendance: 5,000
Referee: Mihály Ivanicsics (Hungary)

=== 1929 ===
10 May 1929
18:00 (UTC+2)

Romania	2–3	Yugoslavia
Subășeanu 20'; Boros 35'	Report	Pavelić 27'; Lemešić 60'; Hitrec 62'

Stadionul Oficiul Naţional de Educaţie Fizică, Bucharest, Romania
Attendance: 15,000
Referee: Eugen Braun (Austria)

=== 1930 ===
4 May 1930
16:00 (UTC+1)

Yugoslavia	2–1	Romania
Premerl 12'; Bonačić 32'	Report	Deșu 72'

Stadion S.K. Jugoslavija, Belgrade, Kingdom of Yugoslavia
Attendance: 8,000
Referee: Ladislav Štépanovský (Czechoslovakia)

As the King Carol's Cup

=== 1936 ===
10 May 1936
17:00 (UTC+3)

Romania	3–2	Yugoslavia
Bodola 21', 46', 51'	Report	Vujadinović 32'; Tomašević 67'

Stadionul Oficiul Naţional de Educaţie Fizică, Bucharest, Romania
Attendance: 30,000
Referee: John Langenus (Belgium)

=== 1937 ===
6 September 1937
17:00 (UTC+1)

Yugoslavia	2–1	Romania
Vujadinović 20'; Lešnik 28'	Report	Baratky 62'

Stadion Beogradski S.K., Belgrade, Kingdom of Yugoslavia
Attendance: 12,000
Referee: Gustav Krist (Czechoslovakia)

=== 1939 ===
7 May 1939
17:00 (UTC+3)

Romania	1–0	Yugoslavia
Dobay 89'	Report

Stadionul Oficiul Naţional de Educaţie Fizică, Bucharest, Romania
Attendance: 25,000
Referee: Giuseppe Scarpi (Italy)

As the King Mihai Cup

=== 1940 ===
22 September 1940
15:30 (UTC+1)

Yugoslavia	1–2	Romania
Petrović 17'	Report	Popescu I 41'; Bogdan 51'

Stadion Beogradski S.K., Belgrade, Kingdom of Yugoslavia
Attendance: 12,000
Referee: Generoso Dattilo (Italy)

== General statistics ==
Team	Pld	W	D	L	GF	GA	Dif
Yugoslavia	11	6	0	5	20	17	+3
Romania	11	5	0	6	17	20	–3

== All-time top scorers ==
	Player	Team	Goals
1	Iuliu Bodola	Romania	3
2	Ferenc Rónay	Romania	2
2	Aurel Guga	Romania	2
2	Vladimir Vinek	Yugoslavia	2
2	Antun Bonačić	Yugoslavia	2
2	Adolf Percl	Yugoslavia	2
2	Kuzman Sotirović	Yugoslavia	2
2	Đorđe Vujadinović	Yugoslavia	2

== 1937–38 Eduard Benes Cup ==
An extended version of the regular Friendship Cup played between Romania and Yugoslavia.

=== Results ===
18 April 1937
16:30 (+3:00)

Romania	1–1	Czechoslovakia
Bodola 63'	Report	Nejedlý 81'

Stadionul Regele Carol II, Bucharest, Romania
Attendance: 40,000
Referee: Rinaldo Barlassina (Italy)
3 October 1937
15:15 (+1:00)

Czechoslovakia	5–4	(Kingdom of Yugoslavia) Yugoslavia
Rulc 5'; Říha 26'; Senecký 43'; Nejedlý 48'; Sobotka 79'	Report	Pleše 18', 50'; Valjarević 60'; Burgr 71' (o.g.)

Stadion Letná, Prague, Czechoslovakia
Attendance: 18,000
Referee: Alfred Birlem (Germany)
8 May 1938
17:00 (+3:00)

Romania	0–1	(Kingdom of Yugoslavia) Yugoslavia
	Report	Matošić 28'

Stadionul ONEF, Bucharest, Romania
Attendance: 25,000
Referee: Paul Von Herczka (Hungary)
28 August 1938
16:00 (+1:00)

(Kingdom of Yugoslavia) Yugoslavia	1–3	Czechoslovakia
Sipos 56'	Report	Bradáč 19'; Bican 41'; Senecký 69'

Stadion Concordije, Zagreb, Yugoslavia
Attendance: 10,000
Referee: Hans Wuthrich (Switzerland)
6 September 1938
16:00 (+1:00)

(Kingdom of Yugoslavia) Yugoslavia	1–1	Romania
Petrović 42'	Report	Bindea 69'

Beogradski SK Stadium, Belgrade, Yugoslavia
Attendance: 8,000
Referee: Peco Bauwens (Germany)
4 December 1938
14:00 (+1:00)

Czechoslovakia	6–2	Romania
Bican 28', 49', 61', 81'; Ludl 38'; Kopecký 78'	Report	Barátky 25'; Bodola 26'

Stadion Letná, Prague, Czechoslovakia
Attendance: 13,000
Referee: Generoso Dattilo (Italy)

=== Final Table ===
Rank	Team	Pld	W	D	L	GF	GA	GD	Pts
1	Czechoslovakia	4	3	1	0	15	8	+7	7
2	(Kingdom of Yugoslavia) Yugoslavia	4	1	1	2	7	9	-2	3
3	Romania	4	0	2	2	4	9	-5	2

1937–38 Eduard Benes Cup

Czechoslovakia
First title

=== Statistics ===
==== Goalscorers ====
There were 26 goals scored in 6 matches, for an average of 4.33 goals per match.

5 goals

- (Czechoslovakia) Josef Bican

2 goals

- (Czechoslovakia) Karel Senecký
- (Czechoslovakia) Oldřich Nejedlý
- (Kingdom of Yugoslavia) Branko Pleše
- (Romania) Iuliu Bodola

1 goal

- (Czechoslovakia) Jan Říha
- (Czechoslovakia) Jiří Sobotka
- (Czechoslovakia) Josef Ludl
- (Czechoslovakia) Oldřich Rulc
- (Czechoslovakia) Vlastimil Kopecký
- (Czechoslovakia) Vojtěch Bradáč
- (Kingdom of Yugoslavia) Aleksandar Petrović
- (Kingdom of Yugoslavia) Svetislav Valjarević
- (Kingdom of Yugoslavia) Vilim Sipos
- (Kingdom of Yugoslavia) Frane Matošić
- (Romania) Iuliu Barátky
- (Romania) Silviu Bindea

1 own goal

- (Czechoslovakia) Jaroslav Burgr (against Yugoslavia)
