= 1922 King Alexander's Cup =

- Event: King Alexander's Cup
Kingdom of SCS	Romania
(Kingdom of Yugoslavia)	(Romania)
1	2
- Date: 8 June 1922
- Venue: Stadion SK Jugoslavija, Belgrade
- Referee: Heinrich Retschury (Austria)
- Attendance: 5,000

The 1922 King Alexander's Cup (Romanian: Cupa Regelui Alexandru 1922) was the first edition of the Friendship Cup. It was a single-game tournament in 1922 and the first official match of the national association football team of Romania.

== Pre-match ==
The trophy was named after Alexander I, the King of Yugoslavia. The match was organized to celebrate the wedding of King Alexander I of Yugoslavia with the Princess Maria of Romania, the event being announced by the Romanian newspaper, Ecoul Sportiv on 28 May 1922: "On the occasion of the marriage of His Majesty King Alexander I with Her Royal Highness Princess Maria of Romania, His Majesty was pleased to donate a cup that will bear his name, to encourage the progress of the football-association sport in his country and in the country of his wife. This cup will be a challenge and will go definitely to the country which will win it three times in a row or five times in total." The game took place at Stadion SK Jugoslavija in Belgrade, Kingdom of SCS (today part of Serbia), and ended with a 2–1 win for Romania. Three kings were at the game: Alexander I of Yugoslavia, Ferdinand I of Romania and George II of Greece. Romania's equipment for that match was bought by one of its players, Elemer Hirsch and it was black and white, it is believed that the reason those colors were chosen is that Hirsch was a fan of Universitatea Cluj who had the same colors.

== Match ==
June 8, 1922

Yugoslavia	1–2	Romania
Šifer 35' (pen.)		Rónay 41' (pen.); Guga 61'

Stadion SK Jugoslavija
Belgrade, Yugoslavia
Attendance: 5,000
Referee: Heinrich Retschury (Austria)

Yugoslavia	Romania

Squad :
GK Dragutin Friedrich
BK Andrija Kujundžić
BK Jaroslav Šifer
HW Stjepan Šterk
HC Artur Dubravčić (c)
HW Rudolf Rupec
FW Dragutin Babić
FW Branko Zinaja
FW Emil Perška
FW Vladimir Vinek
FW Ivan Šojat
Manager :
Veljko Ugrinić

Positions

- GK = Goalkeeper
- BK = Back
- HW = Half-winger
- HC = Half-center
- FW = Forward

Squad :
GK Adalbert Ritter
BK Alois Szilagyi
BK Elemer Hirsch
HW Dezideriu Jacobi
HC Nicolae Hönigsberg
HW Francisc Zimmermann
FW Aurel Guga (c)
FW Carol Frech
FW Paul Schiller
FW Ferenc Rónay
FW Ioan Auer
Manager :
Teofil Moraru

== Post-match ==
The Romanian newspaper, Ecoul Sportiv wrote after the game: "The Romanian representative team wins the Golden Cup of His Majesty King Alexander, beating Jugo-Slavia 2–1. King Alexander's Cup will be exhibited for a week in Bucharest and then it will be sent to Transylvania to be seen by all sportsmen". Ecoul Sportiv also wrote: "The game of the Romanian national team was a true masterpiece, all the players without exception were good, they combined beautifully with a lot of precision, no shot was taken without thought". The Yugoslavian newspaper, Politika wrote after the game: "Yesterday's international match between the Kingdom of Romania and the Kingdom of Serbs, Croats and Slovenes, counting for the Cup of His Majesty King Alexander I surprised not only the host players, but the entire sports world, which did not doubt the success of our national team".
