= Carol Frech =

Romanian footballer (1896–1959)

Personal information
- Date of birth: 1896
- Date of death: 1959 (aged 62–63)
- Position: Striker

Senior career*
| Years | Team | Apps | (Gls) |
| 1920–1925 | Chinezul Timișoara | | |
| 1925–1926 | Sparta Timișoara | | |
| 1928–1929 | Chinezul Timișoara | | |

International career
| 1922–1924 | Romania | 3 | (0) |
- * Club domestic league appearances and goals

Carol Frech (1896 – 1959) was a Romanian football striker.

== International career ==
Carol Frech played in the first official match of Romania's national team at the 1922 King Alexander's Cup, against Yugoslavia. He was also part of Romania's 1924 Summer Olympics squad, but he did not play in any matches.

Scores and results table. Romania's goal tally first:

International appearances
| App | Date | Venue | Opponent | Result | Competition |
|---|---|---|---|---|---|
| 1. | 8 June 1922 | Belgrade, Yugoslavia | Yugoslavia | 2–1 | Friendly |
| 2. | 10 June 1923 | Bucharest, Romania | Yugoslavia | 1–2 | Friendly |
| 3. | 20 May 1924 | Vienna, Austria | Austria | 1–4 | Friendly |

== Honours ==
Chinezul Timișoara

- Divizia A: 1921–22, 1922–23, 1923–24, 1924–25
