= Paul Schiller =

Paul Schiller may refer to:

- Paul Schiller (footballer) (1895–?), Romanian footballer
- Paul Schiller (screenwriter) (1903–1977), Czech screenwriter
- Paul Schiller (referee), Austrian football referee, see 1975 UEFA Cup final
