= Paul Schiller (footballer) =

Romanian footballer

Personal information
- Date of birth: 7 March 1895
- Date of death: Unknown
- Position: Striker

Senior career*
Years	Team	Apps	(Gls)
1921–1925	Chinezul Timisoara		

International career
1922–1924	Romania	2	(0)
- * Club domestic league appearances and goals

Paul Schiller (born 7 March 1895, date of death unknown) was a Romanian footballer who played as a striker.

== International career ==
Paul Schiller played in the first official match of Romania's national team, a 2–1 victory against Yugoslavia at the 1922 King Alexander's Cup. He also played in a friendly against Czechoslovakia which ended with a 4–1 loss.

== Honours ==
Chinezul Timișoara

- Divizia A: 1921–22, 1922–23, 1923–24, 1924–25
