= Gheorghe Tóth-Bedö =

Romanian footballer

Personal information
- Date of birth: 1895
- Date of death: 1946 (aged 50–51)
- Position: Midfielder

Senior career*
Years	Team	Apps	(Gls)
1920–1924	Chinezul Timișoara		

International career
1923	Romania	1	(0)
- * Club domestic league appearances and goals

Gheorghe Tóth-Bedö (1895 – 1946) was a Romanian footballer who played as a midfielder.

== International career ==
Gheorghe Tóth-Bedö played one match for Romania, on 2 September 1923 under coach Teofil Morariu in a friendly which ended 1–1 against Poland.

== Honours ==
Chinezul Timișoara

- Divizia A: 1921–22, 1922–23, 1923–24
