= Nicolae Hönigsberg =

Romanian footballer

Nicolae Hönigsberg / Miklós Kinigli
Personal information
- Date of birth: 28 August 1901
- Place of birth: Nagyvárad, Austria-Hungary
- Date of death: 8 December 1944 (aged 43)
- Place of death: Mauthausen, Nazi Germany
- Position: Midfielder

Youth career
- Nagyváradi AC

Senior career*
| Years | Team | Apps | (Gls) |
| 1921–1925 | CA Oradea | 49 | (19) |
- Haggibor Cluj
| Total | | 49 | (19) |

International career
| 1922–1924 | Romania | 6 | (0) |
- * Club domestic league appearances and goals

Nicolae Hönigsberg (also known as Miklós Kinigli; 28 August 1901 – 8 December 1944) was a Romanian footballer of Hungarian and Jewish ethnicity. He competed in the men's tournament at the 1924 Summer Olympics.

== Club career ==
Hönigsberg was born on 28 August 1901 in Nagyvárad, Austria-Hungary (today Oradea in Romania), and began playing football at local club CA Oradea for which he appeared in 49 league matches and scored 19 goals. His biggest performance with Oradea was reaching the 1923–24 Divizia A final where they lost 4–1 to Chinezul Timișoara. By the late 1920s he played for Haggibor Cluj, the team of the city's Jewish community.

== International career ==
Hönigsberg was used the entire match by coach Teofil Morariu in the first official match of Romania's national team in the 1922 King Alexander's Cup, against Yugoslavia that ended with a 2–1 win where his performance was praised by the press. He appeared in a total of six games for the national team, the last one being a 6–0 loss to Netherlands in the first round of the 1924 Summer Olympics.

In January 1932, the Gazeta Sporturilor newspaper published a series of articles, analyzing who the best players of Romania's national team were in its first 10 years of activity. Hönigsberg was considered the third best midfielder, with the description:"Finally, the third great midfielder who operated in the national team was Hönigsberg from Oradea, known in the sports world as Kinigli. Without having the physique of Vogl or Steinbach, he surpassed them with his colossal stamina and the extraordinary activity he carried out during the game, which he contested with determination. He was nevertheless one of the fairest players and enjoyed remarkable popularity. On the whole, however, he was inferior to both Vogl and Steinbach."

Scores and results table. Romania's goal tally first:

International appearances
| App | Date | Venue | Opponent | Result | Competition |
|---|---|---|---|---|---|
| 1. | 8 June 1922 | Belgrade, Yugoslavia | Yugoslavia | 2–1 | Friendly |
| 2. | 3 September 1922 | Chernivtsi, Romania | Poland | 1–1 | Friendly |
| 3. | 10 June 1923 | Bucharest, Romania | Yugoslavia | 1–2 | Friendly |
| 4. | 1 July 1923 | Cluj, Romania | Czechoslovakia | 0–6 | Friendly |
| 5. | 20 May 1924 | Vienna, Austria | Austria | 1–4 | Friendly |
| 6. | 27 May 1924 | Colombes, France | Netherlands | 0–6 | 1924 Summer Olympics |

== Personal life and death ==
After he ended his playing career, Hönigsberg worked as a civil servant in Cluj, then in 1935 he was a merchant in Sicily.

Because of his Jewish origins, Hönigsberg was taken to the Mauthausen concentration camp in 1944, during World War II, being one of the Holocaust victims, dying on 8 December, aged 43.

== Honours ==
CA Oradea

- Divizia A runner-up: 1923–24
