= Adalbert Ritter =

Romanian footballer and referee

Personal information
- Date of birth: 29 April 1900
- Place of birth: Temesvár, Austria-Hungary
- Date of death: 23 February 1945 (aged 44)
- Position: Goalkeeper

Senior career*
Years	Team	Apps	(Gls)
1920–1926	Chinezul Timișoara		

International career
1922–1926	Romania	4	(0)
- * Club domestic league appearances and goals

Adalbert Ritter (29 April 1900 – 23 February 1945) was a Romanian football goalkeeper and referee.

== International career ==
Adalbert Ritter played in the first official match of Romania's national team at the 1922 King Alexander's Cup, against Yugoslavia. He was also part of Romania's 1924 Summer Olympics squad.

Scores and results table. Romania's goal tally first:

International appearances
App	Date	Venue	Opponent	Result	Competition
1.	8 June 1922	Belgrade, Yugoslavia	Yugoslavia	2–1	Friendly
2.	2 September 1923	Lviv, Poland	Poland	1–1	Friendly
3.	31 August 1924	Prague, Czechoslovakia	Czechoslovakia	1–4	Friendly
4.	7 May 1926	Istanbul, Turkey	Turkey	3–1	Friendly

== Honours ==
Chinezul Timișoara

- Divizia A: 1921–22, 1922–23, 1923–24, 1924–25, 1925–26
