= Elemer Hirsch =

Romanian footballer

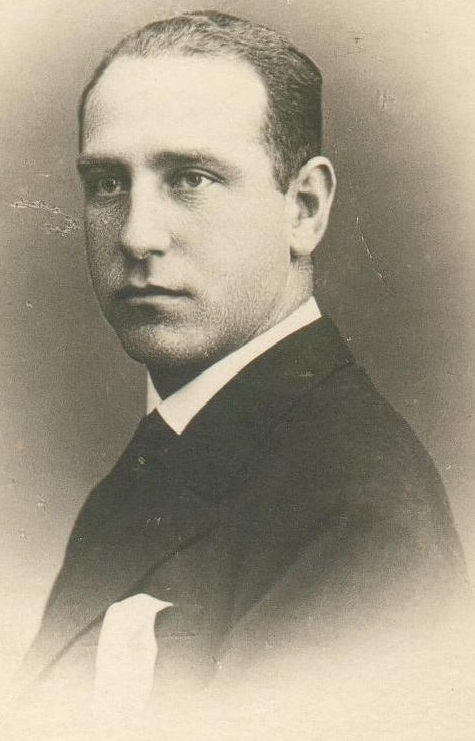

Personal information
- Date of birth: 14 May 1895
- Place of birth: Ceanu Mare, Austria-Hungary
- Date of death: 17 May 1953 (aged 58)
- Place of death: Baia Mare, Romania
- Position: Defender

Senior career*
Years	Team	Apps	(Gls)
1921–1923	CA Cluj		
1924–1926	Universitatea Cluj	26	(2)

International career
1922–1924	Romania	5	(0)

Managerial career
- 1947–1948: CFR Cluj
- 1950–1953: Armata Cluj
- * Club domestic league appearances and goals

Elemer Hirsch (14 May 1895 – 17 May 1953) was a Romanian lawyer, figure skater, ice hockey player and a football defender, manager and referee.

== Life and career ==
Hirsch was born on 14 May 1895 in Ceanu Mare, Austria-Hungary. He came from a wealthy Jewish family who owned large portions of land in Beclean. Hirsch studied law school in Budapest and Vienna, starting to work as a lawyer at age 24. He started playing football at CA Cluj. Several years later he moved to Universitatea Cluj, where he also played ice hockey. Hirsch also competed in figure skating competitions, managing to win three Romanian national titles in 1924, 1925 and 1927, and become an international figure skating judge. After he retired from playing football, he became a football referee, including officiating in a Romanian top-division Divizia A match. In the 1940s following the Second Vienna Award, due to his Jewish origin, the Hungarian authorities prohibited him from working as a lawyer and deprived him of his property which was later nationalized by the Romanian communist regime. Hirsch managed to escape from Cluj when the authorities wanted to send him to a Holocaust extermination camp. After the end of World War II he returned to Cluj and started his coaching career at CFR. Between 1947 and 1948 he was the federal captain of Romania's national team. In 1950 he became coach at Armata Cluj. In May 1953, after a match in Baia Mare he collapsed on his way to the team bus and goalkeeper Nicolae Szoboszlay tried to give him first aid, but Hirsch died in his arms.

== International career ==
Hirsch played in the first official match of Romania's national team, under coach Teofil Morariu in the 1922 King Alexander's Cup against Yugoslavia. He bought Romania's equipment for that match with his own money. Hirsch was also part of Romania's 1924 Summer Olympics squad.

Scores and results table. Romania's goal tally first:

International appearances
App	Date	Venue	Opponent	Result	Competition
1.	8 June 1922	Belgrade, Yugoslavia	Yugoslavia	2–1	Friendly
2.	3 September 1922	Chernivtsi, Romania	Poland	1–1	Friendly
3.	1 July 1923	Cluj, Romania	Czechoslovakia	0–6	Friendly
4.	2 September 1923	Lviv, Poland	Poland	1–1	Friendly
5.	20 May 1924	Vienna, Austria	Austria	1–4	Friendly

== Gallery ==
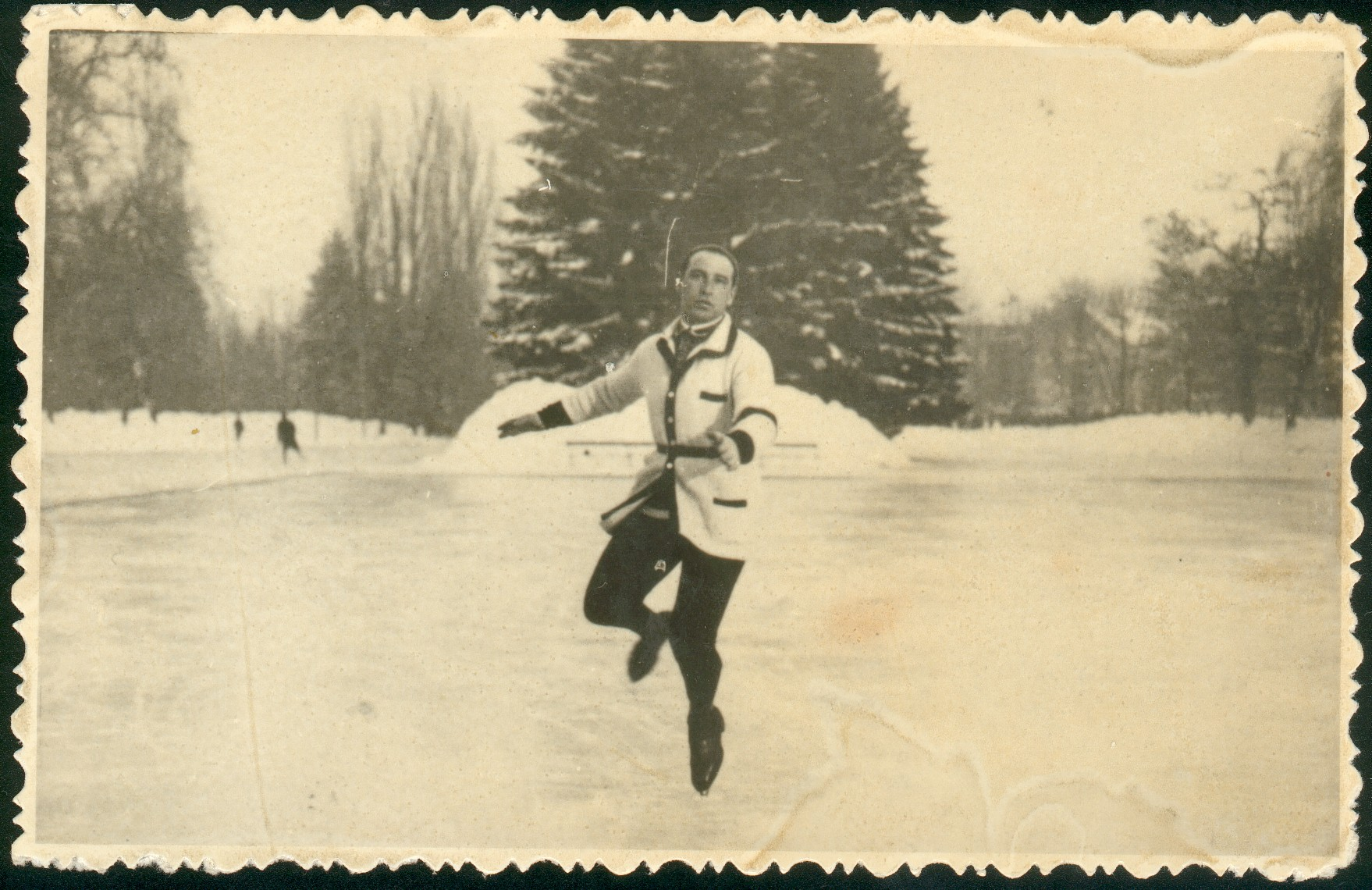
Hirsch ice skating.

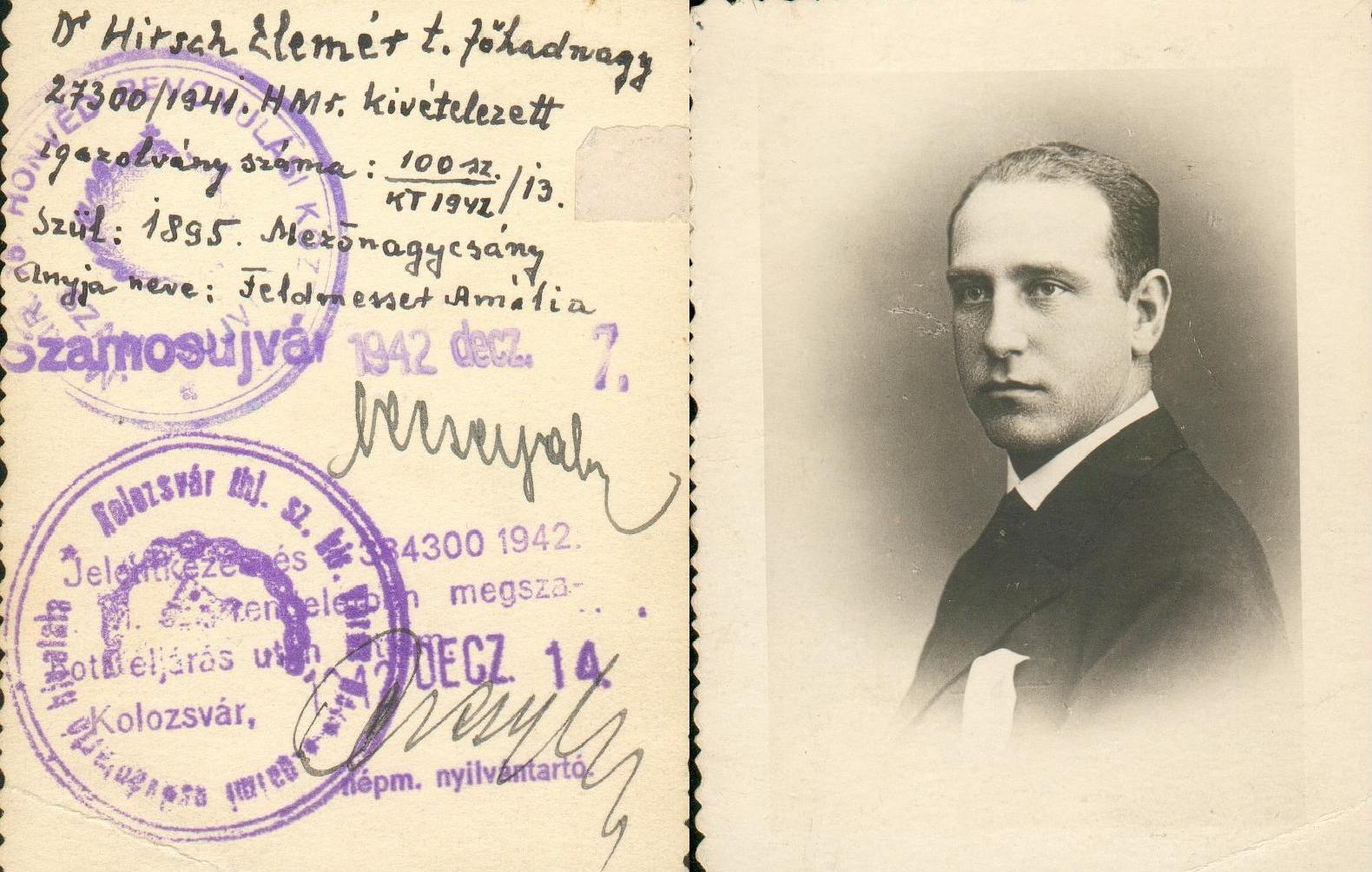
Hirsch's certificate of exemption from Jewish law restrictions.

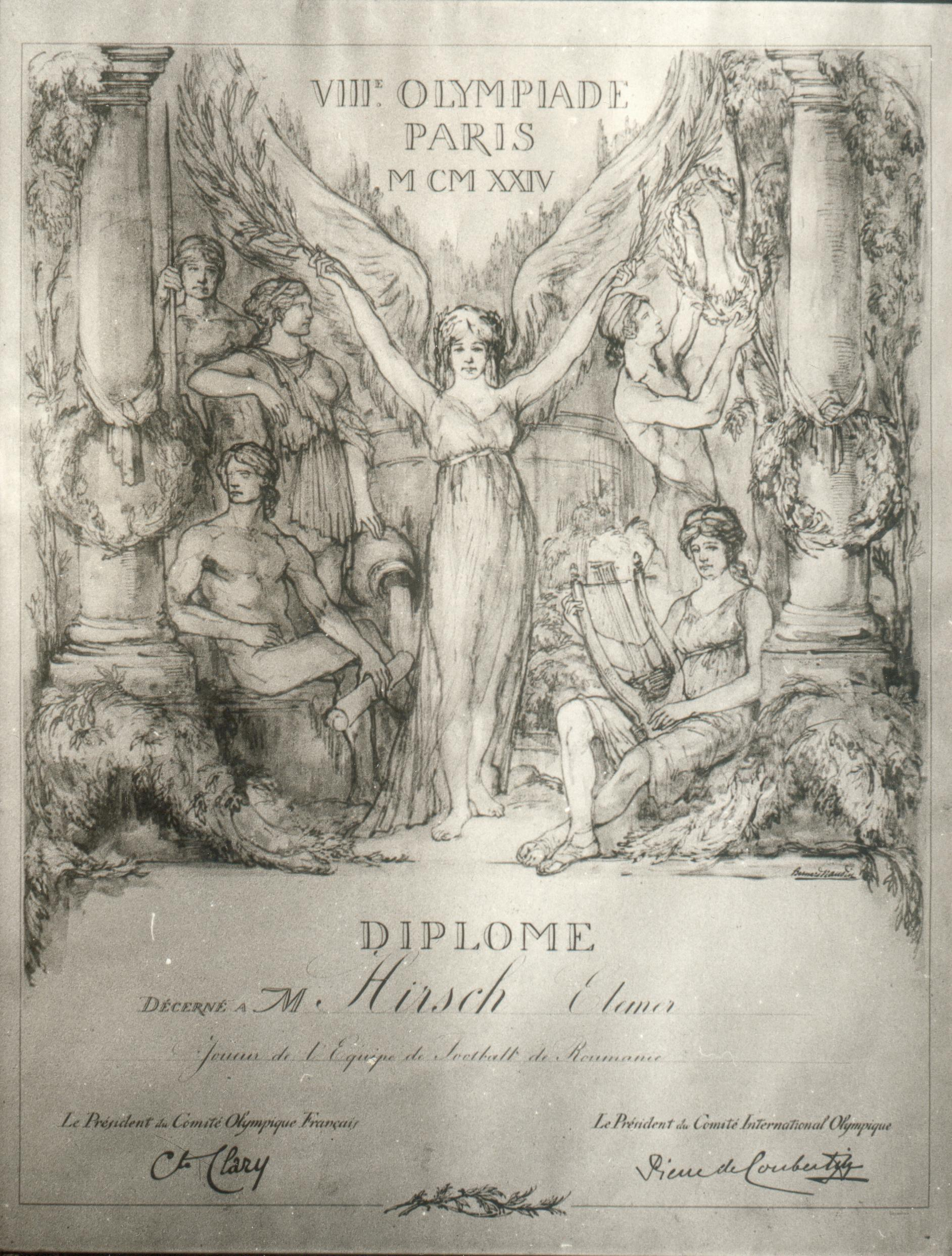
Hirsch's Olympics participation diploma.

== See also ==
- List of Jews in sports (non-players)
