= Polonia Cernăuți =

Polish football club

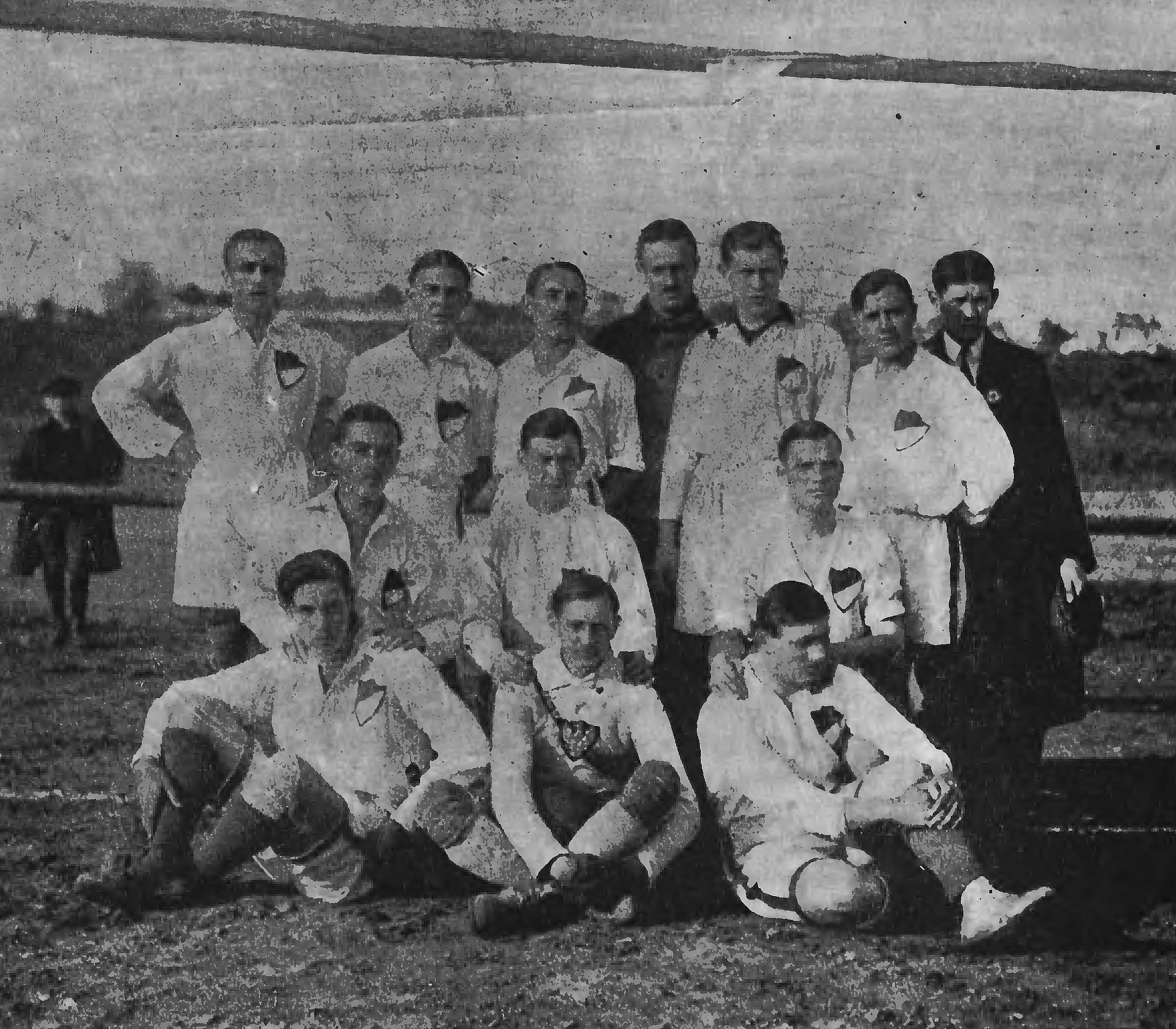
- A team photo, 1920
- Full name: PKF Polonia Cernăuţi
- Founded: 1907
- Dissolved: 1940
- Ground: Boisko Polskie
- Capacity: 5,000

PKF Polonia Cernăuţi was a Polish football club based in the city of Cernăuţi, Bukovina, Kingdom of Romania (now in Ukraine).

== History ==
The club became the regional champion of Bukovina in 1926. Polonia Cernăuţi played three seasons in the Romanian Top division as follows:

- 1921–22 season
- 1922–23 season
- 1927–28 season

In 1940, when the Soviets invaded Bukovina, the club was closed.

Every ethnicity had their own team in Chernivtsi: Romanians (Dragoş Vodă Cernăuţi), Germans (Jahn Cernăuți), Jews (Maccabi Cernăuți and Hakoah Cernăuți), Poles (Polonia Cernăuți), and Ukrainians (Dovbuș Cernăuți).

== Honours ==
- Bukovina Championship (Romanian: Campionatul Bucovinei)
  - Winners (5): 1918–19, 1920–21, 1921–22, 1922–23, 1927–28
