= Dezideriu Jacobi =

Romanian footballer

Personal information
- Date of birth: 23 March 1900
- Date of death: 5 October 1924 (aged 24)
- Place of death: Vienna, Austria
- Position: Defender

Senior career*
Years	Team	Apps	(Gls)
1921–1924	Haggibor Cluj		

International career
1922–1924	Romania	5	(0)
- * Club domestic league appearances and goals

Dezideriu Jacobi (23 March 1900 – 5 October 1924) was a Romanian football defender.

== International career ==
Dezideriu Jacobi played in the first official match of Romania's national team at the 1922 King Alexander's Cup, against Yugoslavia. He was also part of Romania's 1924 Summer Olympics squad.

Scores and results table. Romania's goal tally first:

International appearances
App	Date	Venue	Opponent	Result	Competition
1.	8 June 1922	Belgrade, Yugoslavia	Yugoslavia	2–1	Friendly
2.	10 June 1923	Bucharest, Romania	Yugoslavia	1–2	Friendly
3.	1 July 1923	Cluj, Romania	Czechoslovakia	0–6	Friendly
4.	2 September 1923	Lviv, Poland	Poland	1–1	Friendly
5.	20 May 1924	Vienna, Austria	Austria	1–4	Friendly
