= Balázs Hoksary =

Romanian footballer

Personal information
- Date of birth: 22 November 1902
- Place of birth: Arad, Romania
- Date of death: 13 February 1988 (aged 85)
- Place of death: Timișoara, Romania
- Position: Defender

Youth career
- 1916–1921: Chinezul Timișoara

Senior career*
| Years | Team | Apps | (Gls) |
| 1921–1924 | Chinezul Timișoara (Note: The statistics for the 1921–22, 1922–23, Divizia A 1923–24 seasons are unavailable.) | 2 | (0) |
| 1925 | Fulgerul CFR Chișinău | | |
| 1926–1929 | Chinezul Timișoara | 23 | (2) |
| 1930–1937 | Ripensia Timișoara | 58 | (2) |
| 1937–1938 | Progresul Timișoara | | |
| Total | | 83 | (4) |

International career
| 1926–1928 | Romania | 5 | (0) |

Managerial career
- 1946–1949: CFR Timișoara
- 1952: Locomotiva Timișoara
- * Club domestic league appearances and goals

Balázs Hoksary (born 22 November 1902 – 13 February 1988) was a Romanian football defender and manager.

== International career ==
Balázs Hoksary played five games at international level for Romania, making his debut in a friendly which ended with a 3–1 victory against Turkey.

== Honours ==
=== Player ===
Chinezul Timișoara

- Divizia A: 1921–22, 1922–23, 1923–24, 1924–25, 1925–26, 1926–27

Ripensia Timișoara

- Divizia A: 1932–33, 1934–35, 1935–36
- Cupa României: 1933–34, 1935–36, runner-up 1934–35, 1936–37

=== Manager ===
CFR Timișoara

- Divizia A runner-up: 1947–48
- Cupa României runner-up: 1947–48
