= Csapó =

Csapó is a surname of Hungarian origin. Notable people with the surname include:

- Gábor Csapó (1950–2022), Hungarian water polo player
- Gabriella Csapó-Fekete (1954–2023), Hungarian volleyball player
- Géza Csapó (1950–2022), Hungarian sprint canoeist
- Károly Csapó (born 1952), Hungarian footballer
