= 1921–22 Divizia A =

10th season of top-tier football league in Romania

The Romanian National Football Championship
- Season: 1921–22
- Champions: Chinezul Timișoara

The 1921–22 season of the Romanian Football Championship was the tenth edition of the top-level football league of Romania and it also marked the inception of Romania's first official national football championship, which featured teams from across the entire territory of Greater Romania. Chinezul Timișoara became champions for the first time in their history.

The competition was structured in two phases: an initial regional phase, with its own tournament, followed by a knockout stage featuring the regional champions to determine the national champion. The inaugural championship involved 7 regional champions, representing Arad, Bucharest, Timișoara, Brașov and Sibiu (with separate competitions in the fall, but with the consolidation of the best teams into a new championship in the spring), Cluj (including Târgu Mureș), Oradea (Oradea Mare, as it was called at the time, including Satu Mare, Carei, and Salonta) and Cernăuți. While regional matches were played in a home-and-away format, the final tournament matches were held as knockout games on the home ground of one of the competing teams.

== Regional champions ==
Region	Team
Arad	AMEF Arad
Bucharest	Tricolor București
Brașov–Sibiu	Societatea Gimnastică Sibiu
Cernăuţi	Polonia Cernăuți
Cluj–Mureș	Victoria Cluj
Oradea Mare	Stăruința Oradea
Timișoara	Chinezul Timișoara

Location of regional champions in Greater Romania

== The national phase of the Romanian Football Championship ==
=== Quarter-finals ===
Tie no	Home team	Score	Away team
1	Polonia Cernăuți	0–1	Tricolor București
2	Victoria Cluj	2–2	Stăruința Oradea
Replay	Victoria Cluj	0–0	Stăruința Oradea
Replay	Victoria Cluj	2–0	Stăruința Oradea
3	Chinezul Timișoara	w/o ^{1}	Societatea Gimnastică Sibiu
4	AMEF Arad	bye ^{2}	

^{1} The team from Sibiu failed to appear, so by administrative decision they forfeited the game.

^{2} The team from Arad received a bye from the quarterfinals.

23 July 1922
18:00

Polonia Cernăuți	0–1	Tricolor București
		Fianu 55'

Boisko Polskie, Cernăuți
Referee: Lajos Nagy (Cluj)

27 August 1922

Victoria Cluj	2–2	Stăruința Oradea
Barabás II 16' 56'		Ströck II 32'; Bartha 66'

Orășenesc, Cluj
Referee: Steinhübel Zoltán (Arad)

==== Replay ====
6 September 1922

Victoria Cluj	0–0	Stăruința Oradea

Orășenesc, Cluj
Referee: Steinhübel Zoltán (Arad)

==== Replay ====
7 September 1922

Victoria Cluj	2–0	Stăruința Oradea
Barta 20' (pen.); Cipcigan 80'

Orășenesc, Cluj
Referee: Steinhübel Zoltán (Arad)

=== Semi-finals ===
Tie no	Home team	Score	Away team
1	Chinezul Timișoara	2–1	AMEF Arad
2	Victoria Cluj	w/o ^{3}	Tricolor București

^{3} The team from Bucharest failed to appear, so by administrative decision they forfeited the game.

10 September 1922

Chinezul Timișoara	2–1	AMEF Arad
Frech II 44'; Steiner 78'		Csapó 73'

Banatul, Timișoara
Referee: Kovács (Timișoara)

=== Final ===
Home team	Score	Away team
Chinezul Timișoara	5–1	Victoria Cluj

== Champion squad ==
Chinezul Timișoara

Goalkeepers: Adalbert Ritter.
Defenders: Kondor, Balázs Hoksary.
Midfielders: Fenyvessy, Gheorghe Tóth-Bedö, Rainak.
Forwards: Bruno Steiner, Frech I, Rudolf Matek, Mihai Tänzer, Carol Frech II.
(the players that played the final)

Manager: Frontz Dőme (Hungary) .
