= Ioan Auer =

Romanian footballer

Personal information
- Date of birth: 18 April 1902
- Date of death: Unknown
- Position: Striker

Senior career*
Years	Team	Apps	(Gls)
1921–1927	AMEF Arad		

International career
1922	Romania	1	(0)
- * Club domestic league appearances and goals

Ioan Auer (born 18 April 1902, date of death unknown) was a Romanian footballer who played as a striker.

== International career ==
Ioan Auer played in the first official match of Romania's national team, a 2–1 victory against Yugoslavia at the 1922 King Alexander's Cup.
