= Mirko Bonačić =

Croatian footballer

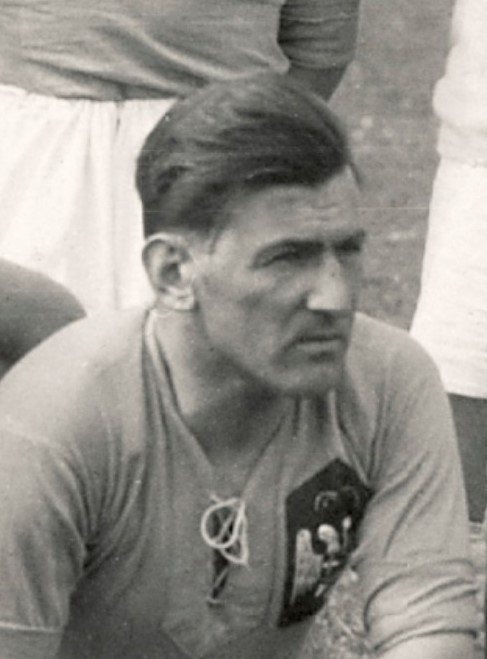
- Mirko Bonačić in 1928

Personal information
- Date of birth: 19 March 1903
- Place of birth: Split, Austria-Hungary
- Date of death: 18 October 1989 (aged 86)
- Place of death: Split, Yugoslavia
- Position: Midfielder

Senior career*
Years	Team	Apps	(Gls)
1922–1928	Hajduk Split	18	(5)

International career
1924–1928	Kingdom of Serbs, Croats and Slovenes	6	(3)
- * Club domestic league appearances and goals

Mirko Bonačić (19 March 1903 – 18 October 1989) was a Croatian footballer. He competed in the men's tournament at the 1928 Summer Olympics.

== International career ==
He made his debut for Yugoslavia in a September 1924 friendly match against Czechoslovakia and earned a total of 6 caps scoring 3 goals. His final international was a May 1928 Olympic Games match against Portugal in Amsterdam.
