= Gabriella Csapó-Fekete =

Hungarian volleyball player (1954–2023)

Personal information
- Nationality: Hungarian
- Born: 23 August 1954; Nyíregyháza, Hungary
- Died: 19 June 2023 (aged 68); Augsburg, Germany

Sport
- Sport: Volleyball

Gabriella Csapó-Fekete (23 August 1954 – 19 June 2023) was a Hungarian volleyball player. She competed at the 1976 Summer Olympics and the 1980 Summer Olympics. Csapó-Fekete died in Germany on 19 June 2023, at the age of 68.
