= Karel Senecký =

Czech footballer

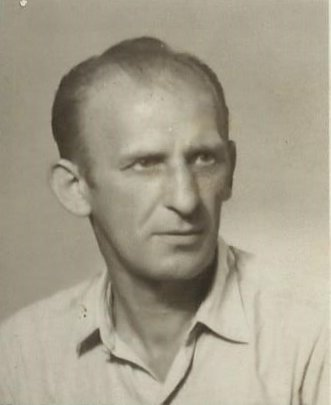

Personal information
- Date of birth: 17 March 1919
- Date of death: 28 April 1979 (aged 60)
- Position: Forward

Senior career*
Years	Team	Apps	(Gls)
- AC Sparta Prague

International career
1937–1948	Czechoslovakia	21	(5)
- * Club domestic league appearances and goals

Karel Senecký (17 March 1919 – 28 April 1979) was a Czech football forward who played for Czechoslovakia in the 1938 FIFA World Cup. He also played for AC Sparta Prague.

In the season 1937–38 he moved to Yugoslavia and became manager of Hajduk Split.

== Fifa World Cup Career ==
National team	Year	Apps	Goals	Assists
Czechoslovakia	1938	1	0	0
