= Leo Lemešić =

Croatian footballer and manager

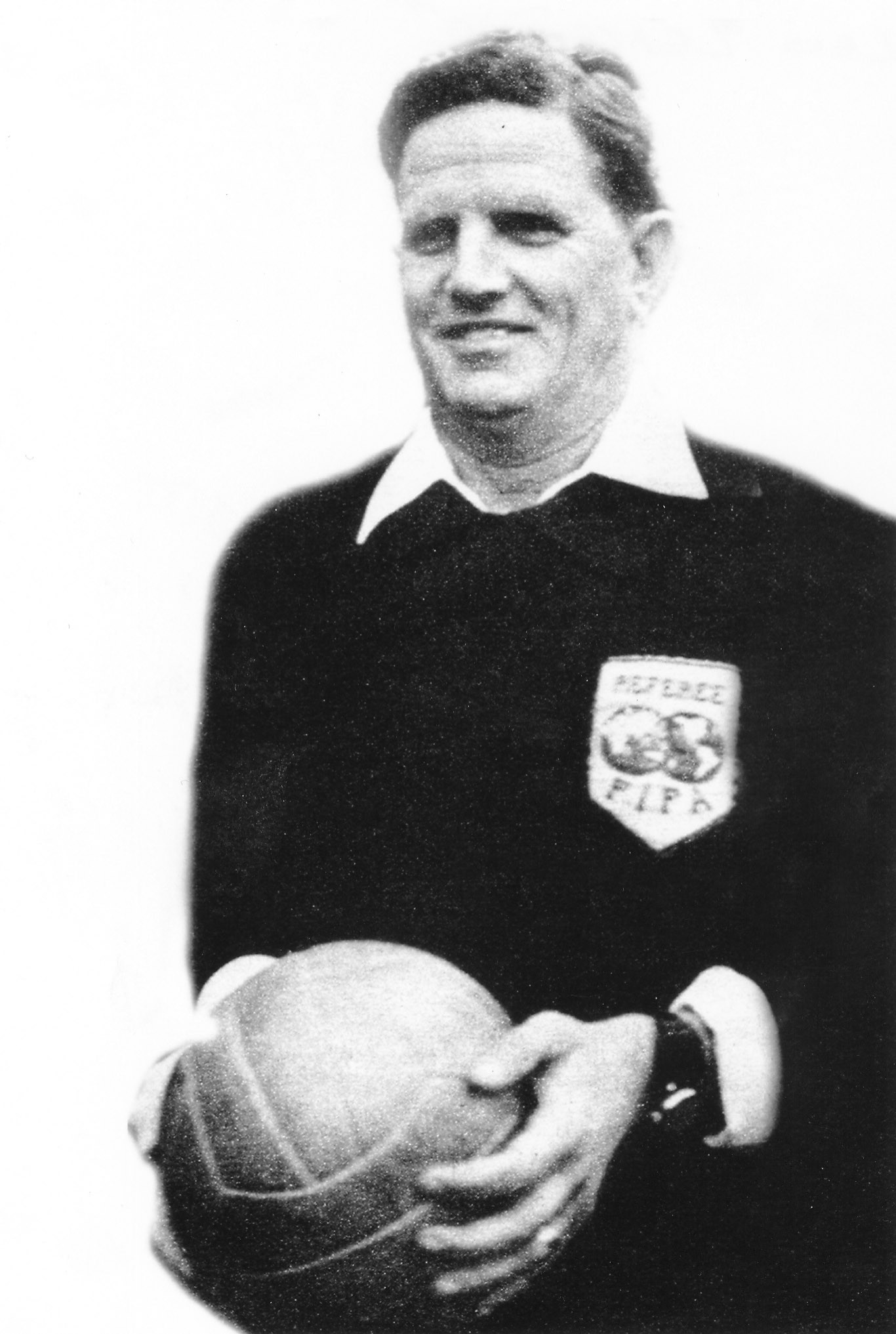

Personal information
- Date of birth: 8 June 1908
- Place of birth: Sinj, Triune Kingdom of Croatia, Slavonia and Dalmatia, Austria-Hungary
- Date of death: 15 August 1978 (aged 70)
- Place of death: Split, SR Croatia, SFR Yugoslavia
- Position: Striker

Senior career*
Years	Team	Apps	(Gls)
1924–1940	Hajduk Split	179	(109)
Total		179	(109)

International career
1929–1932	Yugoslavia	5	(3)

Managerial career
- 1934-1936: RNK Split
- 1952–1954: Yugoslavia
- 1956: PR Croatia
- 1961–1962: Hajduk Split
- * Club domestic league appearances and goals

Leo Lemešić (8 June 1908 in Sinj – 15 August 1978 in Split) was a Croatian football striker and later a football manager. He became a referee in his later years.

== Club career ==
He spent his entire club career with Hajduk Split. In total, Lemešić scored 455 goals in 491 games, making him Hajduk's second most goalscorer, and tenth most capped player. He played his first senior game in 1926.

== International career ==
Lemešić made his debut for Yugoslavia in a May 1929 King Alexander's Cup match against Romania and earned a total of 5 caps, scoring 3 goals. His final international was a May 1932 friendly match against Poland.
