= Francisc Boros =

Romanian footballer

Personal information
- Date of birth: 1906
- Position: Striker

Senior career*
| Years | Team | Apps | (Gls) |
| 1925–1929 | Colțea Brașov | | |
| 1929–1933 | CFR București | 12 | (10) |
| 1933–1935 | Olimpia Arad | | |
| 1935–1936 | CFR București | 8 | (4) |
| Total | | 20 | (14) |

International career
| 1929 | Romania | 2 | (1) |
- * Club domestic league appearances and goals

Francisc Boros (born 1906, date of death unknown) was a Romanian footballer who played as a striker.

== International career ==
Francisc Boros played two matches for Romania, making his debut on 21 April 1929 under coach Constantin Rădulescu in a friendly which ended with a 3–0 victory against Bulgaria. His second game was a 3–2 loss in which he scored one goal against Yugoslavia at the 1929 King Alexander's Cup.

== Honours ==
Colțea Brașov

- Divizia A: 1927–28
