= Jan Říha =

Czech footballer

Personal information
- Date of birth: 11 November 1915
- Place of birth: Písek, Austria-Hungary
- Date of death: 15 December 1995 (aged 80)
- Place of death: Prague, Czech Republic
- Position: Striker

Senior career*
| Years | Team | Apps | (Gls) |
| 1929–1937 | SK Písek | | |
| 1937–1950 | Sparta Prague | | |

International career
| 1937–1948 | Czechoslovakia | 25 | (9) |
- * Club domestic league appearances and goals

Jan Říha (11 November 1915 – 15 December 1995) was a Czech football player. He played for Czechoslovakia, for which he played 25 matches and scored 9 goals.

He was a participant in the 1938 FIFA World Cup.
