= 1922–23 Divizia A =

11th season of top-tier football league in Romania

Divizia A
- Season: 1922–23
- Champions: Chinezul Timișoara

The 1922–23 Divizia A was the eleventh season of Divizia A, the top-level football league of Romania.

== Participating teams ==
Region	Team
Arad	Gloria CFR Arad
Bucharest	Venus București
Brașov-Sibiu	Brașovia Brașov
Cernăuți	Polonia Cernăuți
Cluj	Victoria Cluj
Oradea	Înțelegerea Oradea
Târgu Mureș	CS Mureșul Târgu Mureș
Timișoara	Chinezul Timișoara

== Final Tournament of Regions ==
=== Quarters ===
Team 1	Score	Team 2
Victoria Cluj (Romania)	1–0	(Romania) Înțelegerea Oradea
CS Mureșul Târgu Mureș (Romania)	1–0	(Romania) Polonia Cernăuți
Gloria CFR Arad (Romania)	0–2	(Romania) Chinezul Timișoara
Brașovia Brașov (Romania)	1–1	(Romania) Venus București
Venus București (Romania)	3–0^{1}	(Romania) Brașovia Brașov

^{1} Brașovia failed to appear, so it lost the game with 0–3 by administrative decision.

=== Semifinals ===
Team 1	Score	Team 2
Venus București (Romania)	1–3	(Romania) Victoria Cluj
CS Mureșul Târgu Mureș (Romania)	1–1	(Romania) Chinezul Timișoara
Chinezul Timișoara (Romania)	2–0	(Romania) CS Mureșul Târgu Mureș

=== Final ===
26 August 1923

Victoria Cluj	0–2	Chinezul Timișoara
		Matek ?', ?'

Cluj-Napoca

== Champion squad ==
Chinezul Timișoara

Goalkeepers: Adalbert Ritter.
Defenders: Emerich Vogl, Balázs Hoksary.
Midfielders: Fenyvessy, Gheorghe Tóth-Bedö, Rainak.
Forwards: Mihai Tänzer, Frech I, Hütter, Rudolf Matek, Iosif Kilianovitz.
(the players that played the final)

Manager: Frontz Dőme (Hungary) .
