= Vojtěch Bradáč =

Czech footballer

Personal information
- Date of birth: 6 October 1913
- Place of birth: Žižkov, Austria-Hungary
- Date of death: 30 March 1947 (aged 33)
- Position: Striker

Senior career*
Years	Team	Apps	(Gls)
1926–1932	Viktoria Žižkov		
1932–1936	Slavia Prague		
1936–1937	FC Sochaux-Montbéliard		
1937–1940	Slavia Prague		
1940	Viktoria Žižkov		
1941	Slavia Prague		
1942	Sparta Prague		
1942	Slavia Prague		
1942–1945	SK Nusle		

International career
1931–1938	Czechoslovakia	9	(5)
- * Club domestic league appearances and goals

Vojtěch Bradáč (6 October 1913 – 30 March 1947) was a Czech football player playing as a forward.

He played for clubs in Prague: after starting his career with Viktoria Žižkov in 1930, he moved to Slavia Prague in the 1931–32 season. After a break in France, he re-joined Slavia, subsequently turning out for Žižkov again, Sparta Prague, Slavia again, and SK Nusle.

He played for the Czechoslovakia national team (9 matches/5 goals) and was part of the national team's squad at the 1938 FIFA World Cup, although he didn't play in the tournament.
