= Branko Zinaja =

Croatian footballer

Personal information
- Date of birth: 28 September 1895
- Place of birth: Varaždin, Austria-Hungary
- Date of death: 20 September 1949 (aged 53)
- Place of death: Opatija, Yugoslavia

Senior career*
Years	Team	Apps	(Gls)
1921–1923	HAŠK		

International career
1921-1923	Kingdom of Yugoslavia	6	(4)
- * Club domestic league appearances and goals

Branko Zinaja (28 September 1895 – 20 September 1949) was a Croatian footballer.

== Career ==
He played in six matches for the Yugoslavia national football team between 1921 and 1923.
