= Adolf Percl =

Croatian footballer

Personal information
- Date of birth: 14 October 1901
- Place of birth: Dubrovnik,
- Date of death: 13 August 1951 (aged 49)
- Place of death: , Yugoslavia
- Position: Forward

Senior career*
| Years | Team | Apps | (Gls) |
| 1926–1928 | BSK Beograd | | |
| 1928- | Concordia Zagreb | | |

International career
| 1926–1927 | Kingdom of Yugoslavia | 3 | (2) |
- * Club domestic league appearances and goals

Adolf Percl (14 October 1901 – 13 August 1951) was a Croatian footballer.

== Club career ==
He was a forward and he played for Concordia Zagreb and BSK Belgrade in the Yugoslav First League during the 1920s. He was registered for Concordia on 8 April 1928.

== International career ==
Percl was part of the Yugoslav football squad at the 1924 Summer Olympics and later he played 3 matches and scored 2 goals for the Yugoslavia national team between 1926 and 1927.
