= Aleksandar Petrović (footballer, born 1914) =

Serbian footballer and manager

Personal information
- Full name: Aleksandar Petrović
- Date of birth: 8 September 1914
- Place of birth: Kragujevac, Kingdom of Serbia
- Date of death: 31 July 1987 (aged 72)
- Place of death: Subotica, Yugoslavia
- Position: Forward

Senior career*
Years	Team	Apps	(Gls)
1930–1932	Palilulac Beograd		
1932–1936	Čukarički		
1936–1943	Jugoslavija		
1945–1949	Vojvodina		
1950	Željezničar		

International career
1938–1940	Kingdom of Yugoslavia	9	(5)
1948	Yugoslavia Olympic	0	(0)

Managerial career
- Jesenice
- Proleter Zrenjanin
- 1950: Željezničar
- Novi Sad
- Radnički Niš
- 1959–1960: Zvezda Subotica
- 1969–1970: Crvenka
- Sutjeska Nikšić
Medal record
Men's Football
Representing Yugoslavia
Olympic Games
Silver medal – second place	1948 London	Team
- * Club domestic league appearances and goals

Aleksandar Petrović (Serbian Cyrillic: Александар Петровић; 8 September 1914 – 31 July 1987) was a Serbian football player and manager.

== Club career ==
He was part of the famous SK Jugoslavia attack that become famous in the years before the Second World War league interruption. He is also remembered as an excellent striker, being the sixth all-time pre-1941 Yugoslav First League top-scorer, with a total of 51 goals.

Having been born in Rača, a suburb of Kragujevac, he still young came to Belgrade, where he played for several clubs. He started playing for Palilulac, between 1930 and 1932, and later in Čukarički, until 1936, when he moved to one of the major clubs in the country, SK Jugoslavija. He will play with them until 1943, becoming one of the major league strikers and a fans idol. Those were his best years in which he also became a member of the national team. All the success was interrupted by an unfortunate injury of the meniscus that would make him pause for entire three years! He never fully recovered, despite having returned and played four seasons with FK Vojvodina, between 1945 and 1949, and a single season with Željezničar where despite the difficulties, and his age, he managed to score 8 goals in 14 matches.

== International career ==
He played nine matches for the Yugoslavia national football team and scored five goals. His debut was on 22 May 1938 against Italy in Genova, a 0–4 loss, and his final match was on 22 September 1940 in Belgrade against Romania, also a defeat, this time by 1–2. He was also part of Yugoslavia's squad for the football tournament at the 1948 Summer Olympics, but he did not play in any matches.

== Coaching career ==
After finishing his playing career, he managed a number of Yugoslav clubs such as NK Jesenice, Proleter Zrenjanin, Željezničar, FK Novi Sad, Radnički Niš and FK Zvezda Subotica, being considered his major achievement the promotion to the Yugoslav First League of a relatively minor Serbian club FK Crvenka, in 1970.

After retiring from football, he continued living in Subotica where he eventually died in summer of 1987 with 73 years of age.
