= Franjo Giler =

Yugoslav footballer (1907–1943)

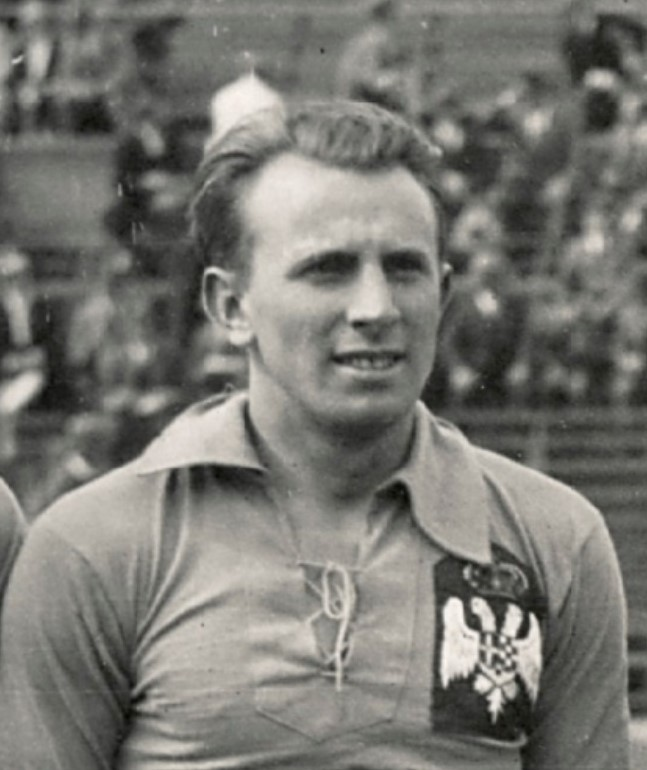
- Giler in 1928

Personal information
- Date of birth: 1 September 1907
- Place of birth: Szávaszentdemeter, Austro-Hungary
- Date of death: 20 December 1943 (aged 36)
- Place of death: Vršac, Banat, German-occupied Serbia
- Position: Midfielder

Senior career*
Years	Team	Apps	(Gls)
1924–1925	Građanski Sr. Mitrovica		
1925–1931	Građanski Zagreb		
1931–1935	Jugoslavija		
1935–1936	Građanski Sr. Mitrovica		
- Čukarički

International career
1926–1932	Yugoslavia	14	(3)

Managerial career
- 1936–1938: Jugoslavija
- * Club domestic league appearances and goals

Franjo Giler (1 September 1907 – 20 December 1943) was a Yugoslav footballer. He was part of Yugoslavia's team at the 1928 Summer Olympics.

== Club career ==
Born in Sremska Mitrovica, Austro-Hungary (nowadays Serbia), he was known as one of the best left wingers in Yugoslavia in the pre-World War II period.

He started playing in Građanski Sremska Mitrovica. and in 1925 he moved to HŠK Građanski Zagreb where he becomes Yugoslav First League champion in 1926 and 1928. In 1929 he suffered a major injury in a national team match against France, and in 1931 he was operated by Doctor Köln in Vienna, becoming the first Yugoslav footballer to be operated to the meniscus. In 1931 he joined SK Jugoslavija where he played until 1935 making 35 appearances and 12 goals. Afterwards he became a player/manager at another Belgrade club, FK Čukarički.

== International career ==
He made his debut for Yugoslavia in a May 1926 friendly match against Bulgaria and earned a total of 13 caps, scoring 3 goals. His final international was a June 1932 Balkan Cup match, also against Bulgaria. He made also 2 appearances for the Yugoslavia B team, between 1927 and 1928.

== Death ==
During the World War II, as a volksdeutscher, more precisely Croat of German origin, he was mobilised by the German authorities, but he tried to escape and join Yugoslav Partisans in the region of Srem, however he was ultimately captured by the Gestapo and shot dead in Vršac on 20 December 1943.
