= Ico Hitrec =

Yugoslavian footballer (1911–1946)

Personal information
- Full name: Ivan Hitrec
- Date of birth: 13 April 1911
- Place of birth: Zagreb, Austria-Hungary
- Date of death: 11 October 1946 (aged 35)
- Place of death: Zagreb, Yugoslavia
- Position: Striker

Youth career
- 1924–1927: Ilirija Zagreb

Senior career*
Years	Team	Apps	(Gls)
1927–1931	HAŠK		
1931–1932	Grasshopper Club Zürich		
1933	Krajišnik Banja Luka		
1933	Sparta Zagreb		
1933–1940	HAŠK		

International career
1929–1939	Kingdom of Yugoslavia	14	(10)

Managerial career
- 1945: OSK Mladost
- 1945–1946: Dinamo Zagreb (assistant)
- * Club domestic league appearances and goals

Ivan "Ico" Hitrec (13 April 1911 – 11 October 1946) was a Yugoslav football player.

He was the first technical officer and in his office in the Zagreb power-works in Gundulićeva Street, the best players from Građanski met and discussed forming a new club with blue shirts which later became Dinamo Zagreb.

== Club career ==
The centre-forward became a legend after scoring twice against then famous Spanish keeper Ricardo Zamora during the first night game in Zagreb between Zagreb and Madrid in 1931. As one of the first Croatian international players, he went on to play for Grasshopper of Switzerland, and "Kicker", at the time the foremost sports journal in Europe, chose him as a member of the European elite 11.

== International career ==
Hitrec was a goal-scorer for the Kingdom of Yugoslavia national team. He appeared in 14 international games and scored 9 goals in 7 of them. He was one of seven Croatian players to boycott the Yugoslavia national team at the 1930 FIFA World Cup after the Football Association of Yugoslavia was moved from Zagreb to Belgrade. His final international was an October 1939 friendly match against Germany.

== Style of play ==
Hitrec's play was characterized by excellent technique and dribbling skills. He was able to sprint 100 meters in under 12 seconds in football conditions making him one of the fastest footballers of the era. He was also known for very powerful kicks, and was quoted as saying jokingly that he did not like to perform 11 m penalty kicks because they were "too close" (to the goal). Severino Minelli, his Grasshopper teammate, reminisced about Hitrec: "I played many matches where Hitrec was brilliant, the best. But, above all, I remember his kicks. Frightful! Goalkeepers would move away from his balls, I'm not exaggerating, that's indeed how it was."

== Honours ==
=== Grasshopper Club Zürich ===
- Swiss Cup (1932)

=== HAŠK ===
- Yugoslav First League (1937/1938)
