= 1923–24 Divizia A =

12th season of top-tier football league in Romania

Divizia A
- Season: 1923–24
- Champions: Chinezul Timișoara

The 1923–24 Divizia A was the twelfth season of Divizia A, the top-level football league of Romania.

== Participating teams ==
Region	Team
Arad	Societatea Gimnastică Arad
Bucharest	Venus București
Brașov	Brașovia Brașov
Cernăuți	Jahn Cernăuți
Cluj	Universitatea Cluj
Oradea	Clubul Atletic Oradea
Sibiu	Șoimii Sibiu
Târgu Mureș	CFR Mureșul Târgu Mureș
Timișoara	Chinezul Timișoara

== Final Tournament of Regions ==
=== Preliminary round ===
Team 1	Score	Team 2
CFR Mureșul Târgu Mureș (Romania)	4–0	(Romania) Șoimii Sibiu

=== Quarter-finals ===
Team 1	Score	Team 2
CFR Mureșul Târgu Mureș (Romania)	3–1	(Romania) Venus București
Clubul Atletic Oradea (Romania)	0–0	(Romania) Universitatea Cluj
Universitatea Cluj (Romania)	0–3	(Romania) Clubul Atletic Oradea
Chinezul Timișoara (Romania)	2–0	(Romania) Societatea Gimnastică Arad
Jahn Cernăuți (Romania)	3–0^{1}	(Romania) Brașovia Brașov

^{1} Brașovia failed to appear, so it lost the game 0–3 by administrative decision.

=== Semifinals ===
Team 1	Score	Team 2
Clubul Atletic Oradea (Romania)	1–0	(Romania) Jahn Cernăuți
Chinezul Timișoara (Romania)	9–0	(Romania) CFR Mureșul Târgu Mureș

=== Final ===
17 August 1924

Chinezul Timișoara	4–1	Clubul Atletic Oradea
Semler (?); Frech I (?); Tänzer (?); Hoksary (?)		Rónay (?)

Arad

== Champion squad ==
Chinezul Timișoara

Goalkeepers: Adalbert Ritter.
Defenders: Adalbert Rech, Balázs Hoksary.
Midfielders: Fenyvessy, Emerich Vogl, Adalbert Rössler.
Forwards: Mihai Tänzer, Frech I, Paul Schiller, Augustin Semler, Iosif Kilianovitz.
(the players that played the final)

Manager: Frontz Dőme (Hungary) .
