= Ilie Subășeanu =

Romanian footballer

Ilie Subăşeanu
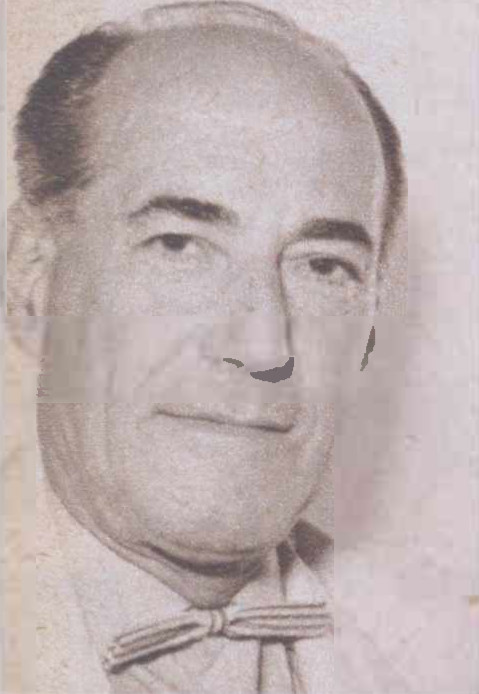

Personal information
- Date of birth: 6 June 1906
- Place of birth: Temesvár, Austria-Hungary
- Date of death: 10 December 1980 (aged 74)
- Height: 1.76 m (5 ft 9 1/2 in)
- Position: Forward

Senior career*
| Years | Team | Apps | (Gls) |
| 1928–1930 | Olympia București | | |

International career
| 1929 | Romania | 2 | (1) |
- * Club domestic league appearances and goals

Ilie Subăşeanu (6 June 1906 - 12 December 1980 ) was a Romanian football forward.

== Career ==
During his career, he has made two appearances and make one goal for the Romania national team. His career in club football was spent in Olympia București.
