= Ivo Pavelić =

Croatian swimmer

Personal information
- Full name: Ivan A. Pavelić
- Date of birth: 10 February 1908
- Place of birth: Zagreb, Kingdom of Croatia-Slavonia, Austria-Hungary
- Date of death: 22 February 2011 (aged 103)
- Place of death: Greenwich, Connecticut, U.S.
- Position: Striker

Senior career*
Years	Team	Apps	(Gls)
1927–1931	Concordia		

International career
1927–1930	Yugoslavia	5	(1)
- * Club domestic league appearances and goals

Ivan A. "Ivo" Pavelić (10 February 1908 – 22 February 2011) was a Croatian swimmer, football player and skier. As a swimmer he competed for Yugoslavia at the 1924 Summer Olympics.

== Early life ==
Pavelić was born in Zagreb as the son of politician and dentist Ante Pavelić and experienced his only international swimming tournament at the 1924 Games in Paris, where he failed to advance beyond the first round of the men's 200 metre breaststroke event.

== Football career ==
Pavelić made his debut for Yugoslavia in an April 1927 friendly match away against Hungary and earned a total of 5 caps, scoring 1 goal. His final international was a November 1930 Balkan Cup match away against Bulgaria.

He eventually graduated from the University of Zagreb with a law degree and opened a private practice in the city after two years of work in the courts. Fluent in five languages, he built an international client base prior to World War II, eventually moving to Switzerland in 1943 during the conflict. While in the country, he competed actively in skiing.

== Personal life ==
Pavelić moved to New York City in 1946 and married Irene Gmur. Soon after he founded Pavimpex Co., an import/export business focusing on lead and copper, with his brother. He moved to Greenwich, Connecticut in 1951 and continued his business, with an emphasis on specialty gifts from Italy and Austria. He retired in 1975 and his wife died in December 1984. Pavelić himself died in Greenwich in February 2011, at the age of 103.
