= Augustin Krist =

Czech football referee (1894–1964)

Augustin Gustav Krist (12 December 1894 – 2 March 1964) was a Czech football referee. He was the first Czechoslovak to be appointed to officiate at a FIFA World Cup final match when he was linesman in the 1938 final between Hungary and Italy in Paris. He was born in Kroměříž.

Krist had earlier been the match referee in the game between Cuba and Sweden in which Sweden won 8–0. Krist had come to prominence in European football circles in the middle of the 1930s, assuming control in various internationals.
