= Vladimir Vinek =

Croatian footballer (1897–1945)

Personal information
- Date of birth: 3 December 1897
- Place of birth: Kašina, Austria-Hungary
- Date of death: 1945 (aged 47–48)
- Place of death: Lepoglava, Yugoslavia
- Position: Striker

Senior career*
Years	Team	Apps	(Gls)
1919–1922	HAŠK		
1922–1925	Concordia		

International career
1922–1924	Kingdom of Serbs, Croats and Slovenes	6	(3)
- * Club domestic league appearances and goals

Vladimir Vinek (3 December 1897 – 1945) was a Croatian footballer. He competed in the men's tournament at the 1924 Summer Olympics.

== International career ==
He made his debut for the Kingdom of Yugoslavia in a June 1922 friendly match against Romania and earned a total of 6 caps, scoring 3 goals. His final international was a May 1924 Olympic Games match against Uruguay.
