= Heinrich Retschury =

Austrian footballer

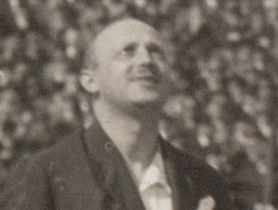

Personal information
- Full name: Heinrich Carl Franz Retschury
- Date of birth: 5 January 1887
- Place of birth: Vienna, Austria-Hungary
- Date of death: 15 December 1944 (aged 57)
- Place of death: Vienna, Nazi Germany
- Position: Defender

Senior career*
Years	Team	Apps	(Gls)
1906 –1912	First Vienna FC		

International career
1908 – 1909	Austria		

Managerial career
- 1914 –1919: Austria
- 1937: Austria
- * Club domestic league appearances and goals

Heinrich Carl Franz Retschury (5 January 1887 – 15 December 1944) was an Austrian football player, referee, coach and official. He played for First Vienna FC and the Austrian team as defender.

== Career ==
Heinrich Retschury played for First Vienna FC as defender. Together with Wilhelm Eipeldauer he formed the defence of the club. He also played in the Austria national football team. His first match was a 4:0 win against Transleithanien. Transleithanien was the Hungarian part of the Austrian-Hungary Empire. He played another 5 times in the team. His last appearance for Austria was a 1:8 versus England on 1 June 1909. Later he was a member of the Olympic squad for the Stockholm Olympic games in 1912, but he did not play there.

== Coach ==
During the First World War he became caretaker of the Austrian national football team while coach Hugo Meisl was serving on the front. (23 matches: 6 won, 4 draws, 13 lost). He became caretaker of the national team again in 1937, after the death of Hugo Meisl. (5 matches: 2 won, 1 draw, 2 lost) Under Retschury, the team qualified for the 1938 FIFA World Cup, but finally did not appear at the tournament, as the country was annexed by Nazi Germany.

== Referee ==
After his football career he became a successful international referee. At the 1924 Olympic Games in Paris, he refereed three matches (round of 16: Belgium-Sweden 1:8; Quarterfinal: Netherlands-Irish Free State 2:1; First Bronze medal: Netherlands-Sweden 1:1;). He also refereed league and cup matches in Austria.

Date	Team1	Score	Score	Team2	Stadium	Round	Notes
29/05/1924	Belgium	1	8	Sweden	Stade Olympique de Colombes	Round of 16	Sweden advance
02/06/1924	Netherlands	2	1	Irish Free State	Stade de Paris (Bauer Saint-Ouen)	Quarterfinal	Netherland Advance AET 2-1 FT 1-1
08/06/1924	Netherlands	1	1	Sweden	Stade Olympique de Colombes	3rd Place Playoff (1st game)	Replayed 09/06/1924 Sweden won 3-1
