= Kristiyan Balov =

Bulgarian footballer

Personal information
- Full name: Kristiyan Teodorov Balov
- Date of birth: 26 July 2006 (age 20)
- Place of birth: Sofia, Bulgaria
- Height: 1.81 m (5 ft 11 in)
- Positions: Winger; attacking midfielder

Team information
- Current team: Red Star Belgrade
- Number: 8

Youth career
- 2012–2024: Slavia Sofia

Senior career*
Years	Team	Apps	(Gls)
2023–2026	Slavia Sofia	52	(5)
2023–2025	→ Slavia Sofia II (loan)	44	(8)
2026–	Red Star Belgrade	6	(1)

International career^{‡}
2022	Bulgaria U17	5	(2)
2023	Bulgaria U18	1	(0)
2023	Bulgaria U19	2	(0)
2024–	Bulgaria U21	7	(0)
2026–	Bulgaria	4	(2)
- * Club domestic league appearances and goals as of 18 October 2026 ‡ National team caps and goals as of 23:22, 13 November 2026 (UTC)

Kristiyan Teodorov Balov (Bulgarian: Кристиян Теодоров Балов; born 26 July 2006) is a Bulgarian professional footballer who plays as a winger and attacking midfielder for Serbian SuperLiga club Red Star Belgrade and the Bulgaria national team. He also holds Serbian citizenship.

== Career ==
=== Slavia Sofia ===
Balov joined Slavia Sofia at the age of six and progressed through the club's youth ranks. He made his first-team debut on 27 May 2024, from the substitute's bench, against CSKA 1948 in the final game of 2023–24 season.

Balov scored his first goal in a 2–1 away loss against Dobrudzha Dobrich on 28 July 2025. On 25 August, he scored against Arda Kardzhali in a man-of-the-match performance to guide Slavia to a 2–0 home victory. On 30 August, Balov continued his good form as a regular starter in the beginning of 2025–26 season with two assists for the 2–2 draw against CSKA Sofia.

=== Red Star Belgrade ===
On 12 June 2026, Balov joined Serbian SuperLiga club Red Star Belgrade on a four-year deal with an option for a fifth.

== International career ==
On 16 March 2026, Balov was called up for the first time for the Bulgaria senior national team. On 27 March 2026, he made his debut for the team in a 10–2 win against the Solomon Islands in the FIFA Series, being subbed on at half-time and scoring his first goal in the 65th minute.

== Career statistics ==
=== Club ===
As of match played 15 October 2026

Appearances and goals by club, season and competition
Club	Season	League			National cup		Europe		Other		Total	
Club	Season	Division	Apps	Goals	Apps	Goals	Apps	Goals	Apps	Goals	Apps	Goals
Slavia Sofia II	2022–23	Bulgarian Third League	3	1	—		—		—		3	1
Slavia Sofia II	2023–24	Bulgarian Third League	30	5	—		—		—		30	5
Slavia Sofia II	2024–25	Bulgarian Third League	11	2	—		—		—		11	2
Slavia Sofia II	Total		44	8	0	0	0	0	0	0	44	8
Slavia Sofia	2023–24	Bulgarian First League	1	0	0	0	—		—		1	0
Slavia Sofia	2024–25	Bulgarian First League	20	0	2	0	—		—		22	0
Slavia Sofia	2025–26	Bulgarian First League	31	5	2	1	—		—		33	6
Slavia Sofia	Total		52	5	4	1	0	0	0	0	56	6
Red Star Belgrade	2026–27	Serbian SuperLiga	5	1	0	0	1 (Note: Appearance in UEFA Conference League)	0	—		6	1
Career total			101	14	4	1	1	0	0	0	106	15

=== International ===
As of match played 13 November 2026

Appearances and goals by national team and year
National team	Year	Apps	Goals
Bulgaria
Bulgaria	2026	4	2
Total		4	2

Scores and results list Bulgaria's goal tally first, score column indicates score after each Balov goal.

List of international goals scored by Kristiyan Balov
No.	Date	Venue	Opponent	Score	Result	Competition
1.	27 March 2026	Gelora Bung Karno Stadium, Jakarta, Indonesia	Solomon Islands	8–1	10–2	2026 FIFA Series
2.	6 October 2026	Stade de Luxembourg, Luxembourg City, Luxembourg	Luxembourg	1–0	2–0	2026–27 UEFA Nations League C

== Honours ==
- Best young player in the Bulgarian First League - 2025-26
