= Kristiyan Stoyanov =

Bulgarian footballer

Personal information
- Full name: Kristiyan Stoyanov Stoyanov
- Date of birth: 29 March 2003 (age 23)
- Place of birth: Sofia, Bulgaria
- Height: 1.71 m (5 ft 7 in)
- Position: Midfielder

Team information
- Current team: Slavia Sofia
- Number: 71

Youth career
- 2012–2023: Slavia Sofia

Senior career*
Years	Team	Apps	(Gls)
2021–2023	Slavia Sofia II	22	(1)
2022–	Slavia Sofia	104	(3)

International career^{‡}
2019	Bulgaria U17	1	(0)
2022–2024	Bulgaria U21	17	(1)
2025–	Bulgaria	6	(0)
- * Club domestic league appearances and goals as of 23:06, 20 September 2026 (UTC) ‡ National team caps and goals as of 23:28, 29 September 2026 (UTC)

Kristiyan Stoyanov (Bulgarian: Кристиян Стоянов; born 29 March 2003) is a Bulgarian professional footballer who plays as a midfielder for First League club Slavia Sofia and the Bulgarian national team.

== Career ==
Stoyanov began his career with Slavia Sofia at the age of 7. His father was also a footballer, which helped him to choose football over other sports. On 19 May 2021, he made his professional debut in a league match against Levski Sofia. In November 2024 it was reported that CSKA Sofia is interested in signing him. He scored his first league goal for Slavia on 6 April 2024, in a match against Arda Kardzhali. On 27 April 2024, in a league match against CSKA 1948, he was named as a team captain for first time.

== International career ==
On 10 March 2025 he received his first call-up for the Bulgarian national team. He was once again called up for the 2026 FIFA World Cup qualifiers against Turkey on 11 October and Spain on 14 October 2025. He made his debut as a starter against Turkey.

== Style of play ==
Stoyanov style of play is found similar to Krasimir Balakov.

== Career statistics ==
=== Club ===
As of 10 November 2026

Club performance			League		Cup		Continental		Other		Total	
Club	League	Season	Apps	Goals	Apps	Goals	Apps	Goals	Apps	Goals	Apps	Goals
Bulgaria			League		Bulgarian Cup		Europe		Other		Total	
Slavia Sofia	First League	2021–22	1	0	0	0	–		–		1	0
Slavia Sofia	First League	2022–23	26	0	0	0	–		–		26	0
Slavia Sofia	First League	2023–24	27	1	1	0	–		–		28	1
Slavia Sofia	First League	2024–25	28	1	0	0	–		–		28	1
Slavia Sofia	First League	2025–26	14	1	1	0	–		–		15	1
Slavia Sofia	First League	2026–27	9	0	1	0	–		–		10	0
Slavia Sofia	Total		105	3	3	0	0	0	0	0	108	3
Career statistics			105	3	3	0	0	0	0	0	108	3

=== International ===
As of match played 30 March 2026

Appearances and goals by national team and year
National team	Year	Apps	Goals
Bulgaria	2025	3	0
Bulgaria	2026	3	0
Total		6	0
