= Bulgaria national football team =

Bulgaria
- Nickname(s): Лъвовете / Lavovete (The Lions); Трикольорите / Trikolyorite (The Tricolours)
- Association: Bulgarian Football Union (BFU)
- Confederation: UEFA (Europe)
- Head coach: Vacant
- Captain: Kiril Despodov
- Most caps: Stiliyan Petrov (105)
- Top scorer: Dimitar Berbatov; Hristo Bonev (48)
- Home stadium: Various
- FIFA code: BUL
First colours	Second colours

FIFA ranking
- Current: 93 ▼3 (18 November 2026)
- Highest: 8 (June 1995)
- Lowest: 96 (May 2012)

First international
- Austria 6–0 Bulgaria (Vienna, Austria; 21 May 1924)

Biggest win
- Bulgaria 10–0 Ghana (León, Mexico; 2 October 1968)

Biggest defeat
- Spain 13–0 Bulgaria (Madrid, Spain; 21 May 1933)

World Cup
- Appearances: 7 (first in 1962)
- Best result: Fourth place (1994)

European Championship
- Appearances: 2 (first in 1996)
- Best result: Group stage (1996, 2004)
Medal record
Olympic Games
Silver medal – second place	1968 Mexico City	Team
Bronze medal – third place	1956 Melbourne	Team
Balkan Cup
Gold medal – first place	1931 Bulgaria	Team
Gold medal – first place	1932 Yugoslavia	Team
Gold medal – first place	1973–76 Europe	Team
Silver medal – second place	1935 Bulgaria	Team
Silver medal – second place	1936 Romania	Team
Bronze medal – third place	1933 Romania	Team

The Bulgaria national football team (Bulgarian: Български национален отбор по футбол, romanized: Bǎlgarski natsionalen otbor po futbol) represents Bulgaria in men's international football, and is administered by the Bulgarian Football Union, a member association of UEFA.

Bulgaria's best achievements are reaching the final at the 1968 Summer Olympics and the fourth-place finish at the FIFA World Cup in 1994. Bulgaria have competed at a total of seven World Cups, debuting in 1962 and last appearing in 1998. In addition, they have participated in two European Championships, in 1996 and 2004, the latter marking their most recent major tournament appearance. The team has also competed at and won three titles in the Balkan Cup.

== History ==
=== 1922–1945: early history ===
The Bulgaria national football team was formed in 1922. In 1923, the Bulgarian Football Union was formed and the team's first match was held in Vienna on 21 May 1924, which resulted in a 6–0 defeat against Austria. Bulgaria also participated in the 1924 Summer Olympics in Paris a few days later.

After being unable to compete in the 1930 World Cup, the Bulgarian side did not qualify for any major tournament for nearly 30 years, narrowly falling short of qualification on numerous occasions. The national team had gone on a streak of finishing 2nd or 3rd in their qualifying groups along with proceeding to the play-offs, but in the end, failing to qualify. Despite their qualifying problems, the national team did manage to defeat many elite teams during memorable international friendlies during those years. The only tournaments they managed to qualify for were smaller ones, such as the Balkan Cup, which they won three times (1931, 1932 and 1973–76), thus being the competition's second most successful team only behind Romania with four titles.

=== 1960s and 1970s ===
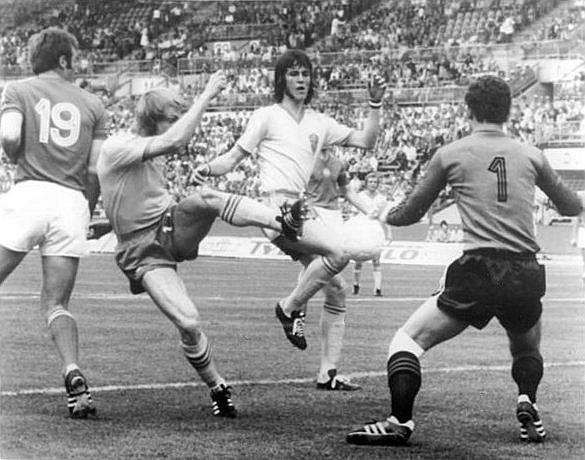
Bulgaria vs. Sweden (0–0) at the 1974 FIFA World Cup

Bulgaria qualified for the World Cup for the first time in its history in 1962 and followed that up with consecutive appearances in 1966, 1970 and 1974. The team, however, did not have much success and finished in third place in their group two out of the four times.

Bulgaria took part in qualifiers for the European Championship in 1968 and went on to win their group with impressive wins over Norway, Sweden, and Portugal. Although they would go on to lose to the eventual champions and hosts Italy in a two-legged qualifying play-off.

At the 1968 Summer Olympics, the team won the silver medal. They finished first in Group D by defeating Thailand 7–0, Guatemala 2–1, and drawing 2–2 against Czechoslovakia. They advanced to the quarter-finals by defeating Israel and then the semi-finals by defeating favored hosts Mexico. In the Olympic Final, the team was defeated by Hungary, in what many would say was a hard-fought match for both sides.

Despite winning the Balkan Cup twice in 1931 and 1932, the Bulgaria national team added two more trophies to their case as they went on to win the tournament in 1973 and 1976. In both 1973 and 1976, Bulgaria had used their previous World Cup experience to create a very tactical team. This paid off quite well, as they had many decisive victories over Hungary, Greece, Turkey, Yugoslavia, Poland, Albania and Romania. In fact, the team won the 1976 Balkan Cup by beating Romania in the two-legged final 1–0 and 3–2.

Bulgaria finally qualified for their first World Cup in 1962. Bulgaria was drawn in a tough group with elite opponents in England, powerhouse Argentina and Hungary. Bulgaria opened up their campaign with a narrow 0–1 loss to Argentina. Later on, Bulgaria would lose their second group match by a 6–1 score to Hungary. Bulgaria's hopes of qualifying were over, but the national team impressively drew with England (who would host and win the next tournament) 0–0 and finished fourth in the group with only one point.

Bulgaria qualified for their second straight World Cup, drawn into an even tougher group compared to the previous World Cup. They were placed in the group of death with superpowers Hungary, Portugal and Brazil, with Pelé at the helm. Bulgaria opened their campaign match with a 0–2 loss to Brazil thanks to two free kick goals by Pelé and Garrincha. In their second match Bulgaria loss 0–3 to Eusebio's Portugal. Finally, Bulgaria with no chance of advancing to the next round, finished their last match with a 1–3 loss to Hungary. Bulgaria once again finished fourth with zero points in the group.

After their poor World Cup performance, Bulgaria was determined to redeem themselves. Bulgaria was drawn in a very tough group for qualifying, with Norway and Sweden, along with Eusebio's Portugal. Bulgaria started off with a 4–2 win over Norway. They would add to their winning streak with a 2–0 victory against Sweden. In their next two matches Bulgaria would draw 0–0 against Norway, and dominate Sweden 3–0. In their final two group fixtures Bulgaria played Portugal to a 1–0 victory at home and an 0–0 draw on the road, but it was enough to advance to the two-legged qualifying play-off. There Bulgaria were drawn against eventual Euro 1968 host Italy. Italy were defeated in the first leg 3–2, but won the second by a 0–2 score to advance 4–3 on aggregate. Italy would win the playoff and go on to win the tournament, while Bulgaria was eliminated from reaching the finals.

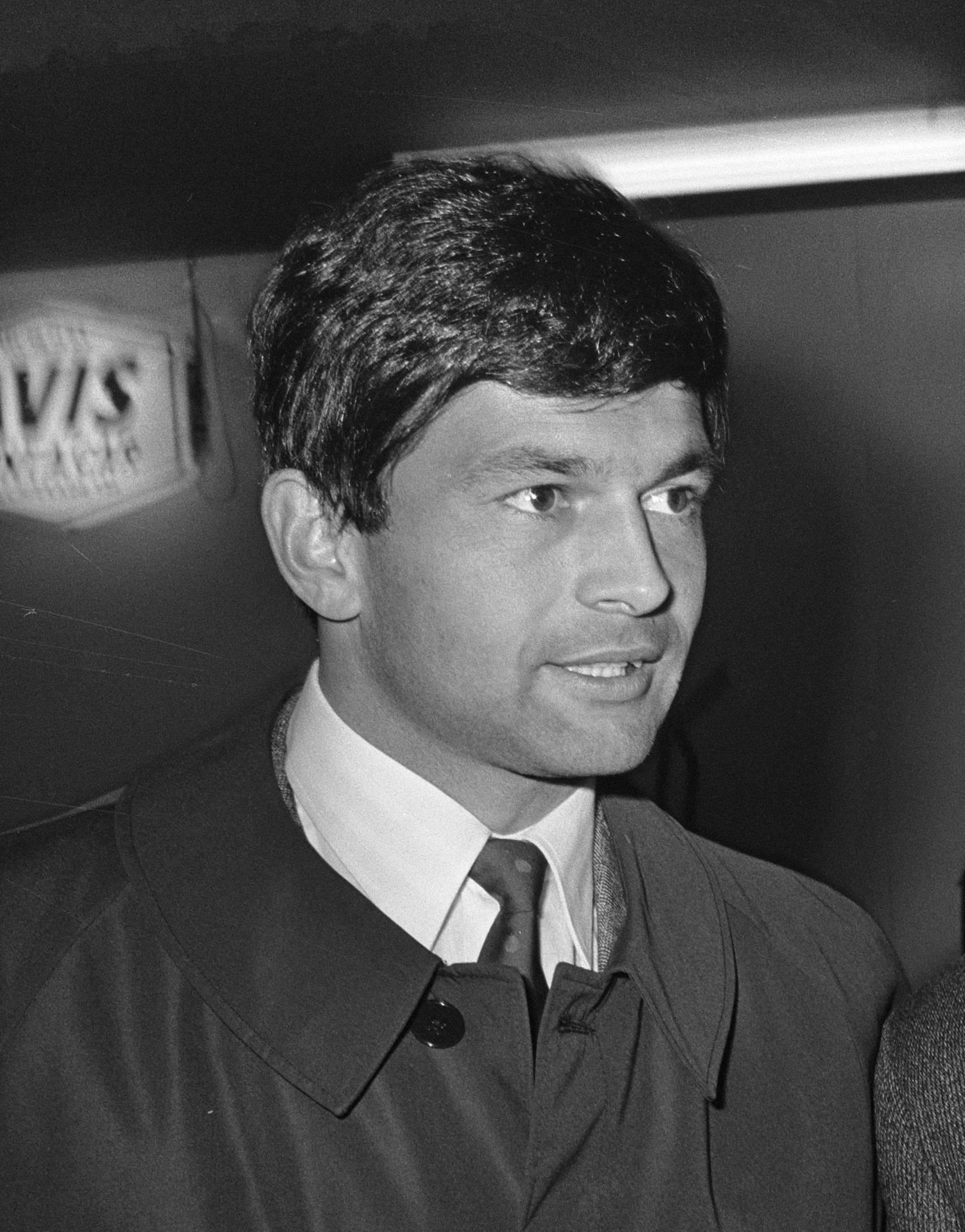
Georgi Asparuhov was considered Bulgaria's first playing legend, leading Bulgaria to four straight World Cup, the 1968 Euro Cup quarter-finals (qualifier) and the 1968 Olympic tournament final

A month and a half after the European Championship qualifying came the Olympics, which Bulgaria had qualified for the fifth time in their history. They were drawn in a simple group with Thailand, Guatemala and Czechoslovakia. Bulgaria started off with a 7–0 thrashing of Thailand. They later went on and drew with Czechoslovakia 2–2 to increase their point standards. Their final match once again determined if they would carry on to the quarter-finals. Needing a decisive win, Bulgaria went on to defeat Guatemala 2–1 and win their Olympic group. They qualified directly to the quarter-finals facing underdogs, Israel. The game remained 1–1 for most of the match until a drawing of lots determined who would go on to the semi-finals of the tournament. Winning the draw Bulgaria advanced to the semi-finals against Mexico. After a very hard-fought match, Bulgaria proved stronger as they came out on top with a 3–2 victory. Bulgaria advanced to the finals for the first time in their Olympic history. They were determined to win the gold medal, but fell short with a 1–4 loss to Hungary. Although battling hard, Bulgaria came out with the silver medal.

Bulgaria qualified for their third straight World Cup, held in Mexico, just like the 1968 Olympics. They were drawn in a very tricky group with Germany, Peru and Morocco. Bulgaria played their first match against Peru, losing 3–2. Germany won Bulgaria's second match, 5–2. The last group stage match ended 1–1; Bulgaria ended up in 3rd place.

The 1974 World Cup was held in West Germany. They were drawn in a decently tough group, with the Netherlands, Sweden and Uruguay. Bulgaria started off with a goalless draw with Sweden, having the better of the first half but missing chances, with Sweden coming into the game in the 2nd. They then drew again, this time 1–1 with Uruguay - the South Americans equalising late on to deny Bulgaria a first World Cup victory. As the final match came, Bulgaria had to beat highly fancied Netherlands to progress - but fell by a 4–1 score to the eventual finalists. Bulgaria remained in third place in the group stages.

=== 1986–2000 ===
Bulgaria qualified for the 1986 World Cup in Mexico by finishing second in Group Four, behind France with 11 points, but ahead of powerful rivals Yugoslavia and East Germany. This was their fifth World Cup appearance. They were drawn in Group A with Italy, Argentina, and South Korea. In the opening match of the World Cup, the Bulgarians held the defending champions Italy to an impressive 1–1 draw. Alessandro Altobelli gave the Italians the lead, but an 85th-minute equalizer by Nasko Sirakov gave the Bulgarians the point they needed. The next match was another 1–1 draw against South Korea with the goal for Bulgaria coming from Plamen Getov in the 11th minute. They lost the final match of the group 2–0 against Argentina, who eventually won the tournament. Despite not recording a win, the Bulgarians advanced to the knockout stage by being the third-best third-placed team. By doing so, Bulgaria along with Uruguay became the first nations to qualify for the knockout stage without winning a game in the first round. In the Round of 16, they faced World Cup hosts Mexico, who were looking for revenge due to their previous home Olympic semi-final loss to Bulgaria in Mexico City in 1968. The match was hard-fought from both sides of the scale but ultimately, Mexico came away with the 2–0 win.

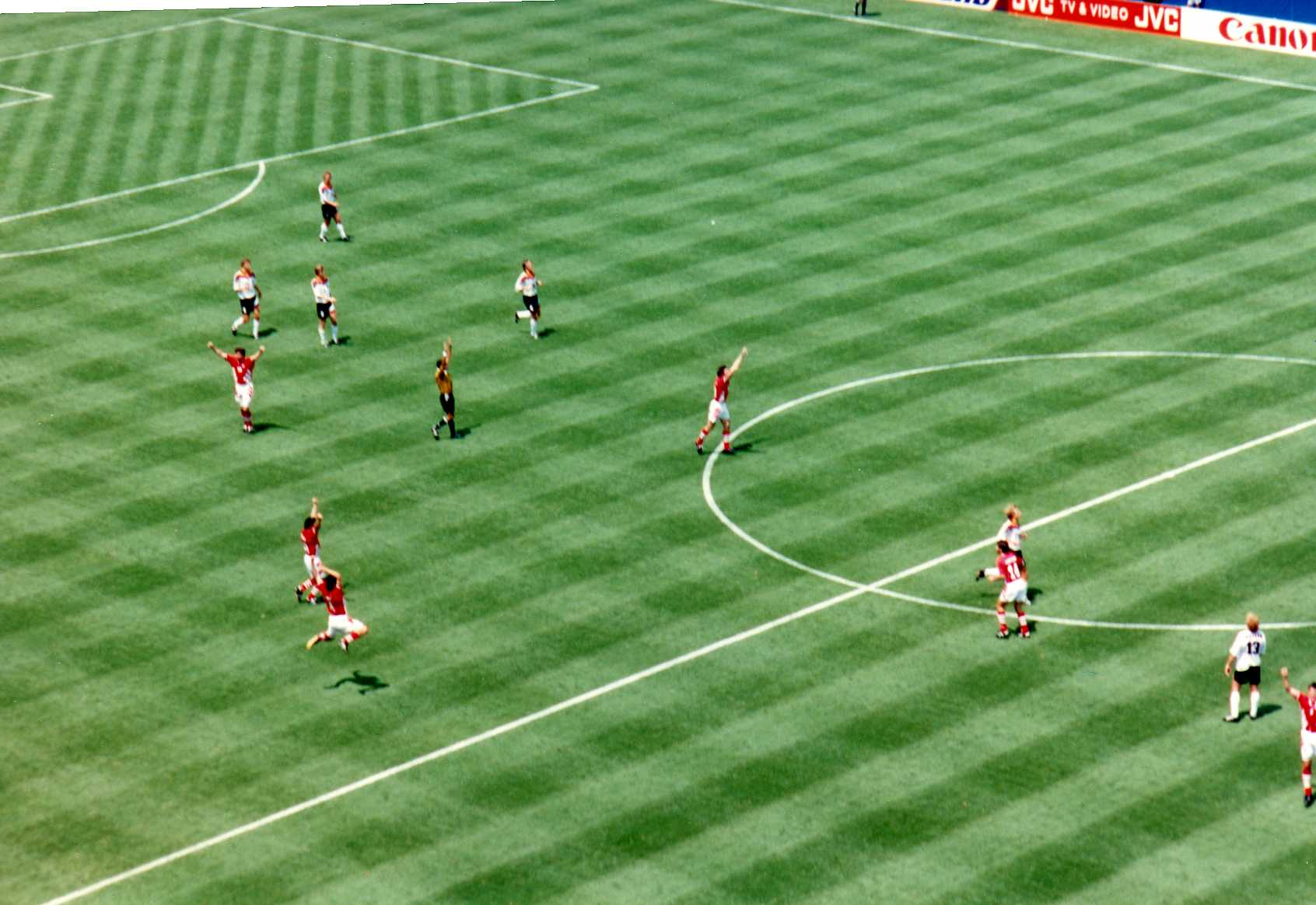
Bulgarian players celebrate victory over world champions Germany in the quarter-finals of the 1994 World Cup at Giants Stadium

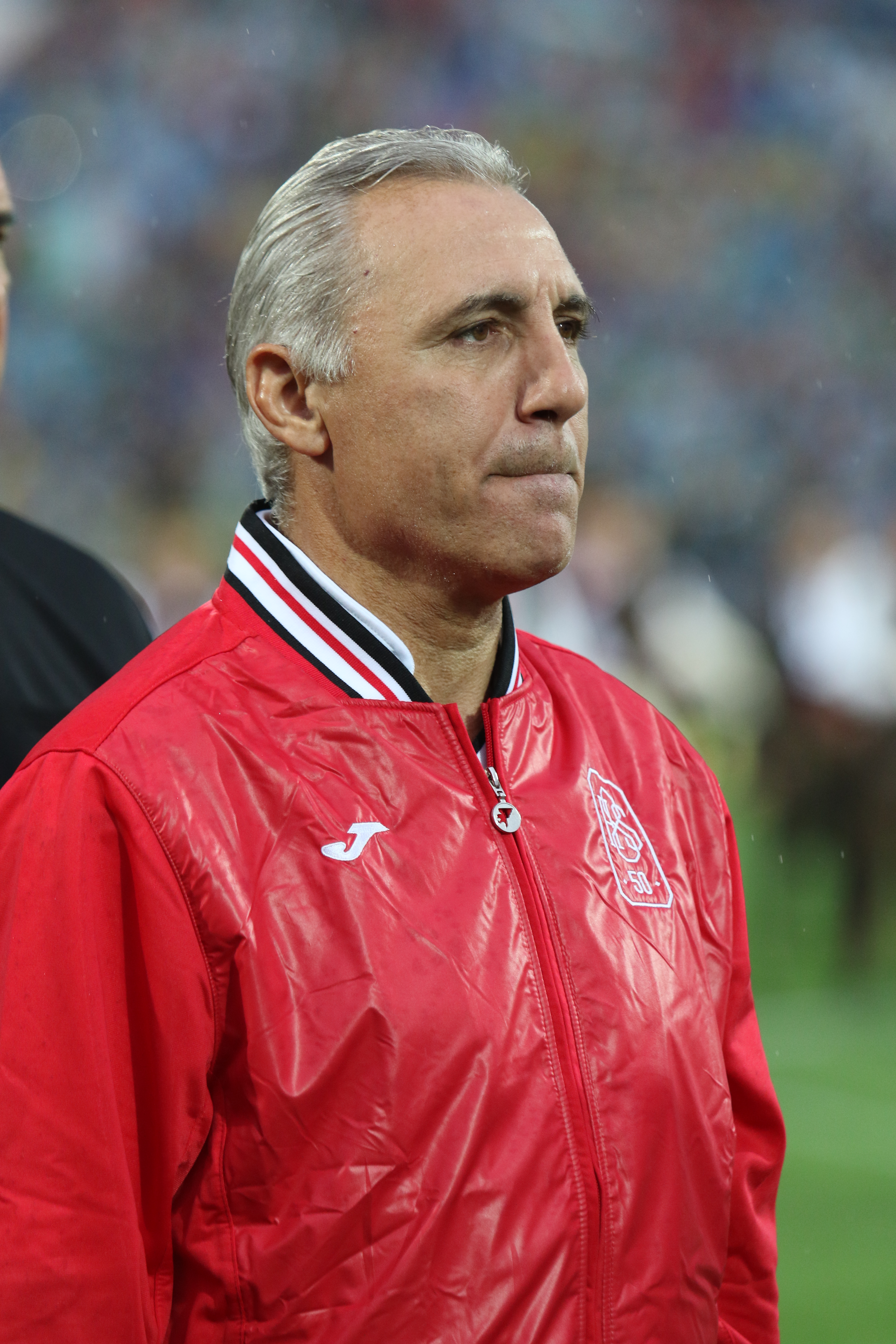
Hristo Stoichkov won the Ballon d'Or, World and European Golden Boots in 1994. He led Bulgaria to the semi-finals of the 1994 World Cup, along with leading Barcelona to their first ever UEFA Champions League title in 1992

One of the most important dates in Bulgarian football history is 17 November 1993, when Emil Kostadinov scored a deciding goal in the 90th minute to beat France in Paris, allowing Bulgaria to qualify for the 1994 World Cup in the United States. Under the management of Dimitar Penev, the Bulgarians, led by players such as Hristo Stoichkov, Yordan Lechkov, and Krasimir Balakov, along with other talented players remembered in Bulgaria as the "Golden Generation", made a strong impression by surprisingly reaching the semi-finals. They entered a tough Group D with 1990 World Cup runners-up Argentina with Diego Maradona at the helm, African Nations Cup champions Nigeria, and Balkan rivals Greece. The first match ended with a 3–0 defeat to Nigeria. Despite the bad start, the team made a statement by winning 4–0 against their neighbours Greece – their first ever win in a World Cup. Their third and final match came against Argentina: the Bulgarian side came away with a shocking 2–0 victory. Going into injury-time, Argentina was leading the group but a 91st-minute strike from Nasko Sirakov, however, meant that they'd drop two places and finish third.

Bulgaria continued to the round of 16, where they faced Mexico. Stoichkov opened the scoring in the sixth minute with an strike on a break away from outside the box, tallying his fourth goal. The match ended 1–1 and after no goals were scored in extra time, penalties decided which team would go through. Team captain Borislav Mihaylov saved the first three penalty kicks, breaking the World Cup record. Bulgaria won 3–1 on penalties. In the quarter-finals, Bulgaria faced the defending world champions Germany. At the start of the match, held in Giants Stadium in East Rutherford, New Jersey, the Bulgarians dominated, hitting the post twice in the process, but eventually found themselves behind after Lothar Matthäus scored the opening goal for the Germans. The Bulgarians, however, managed to turn the game over with a swerving free kick by Hristo Stoichkov and a flying header by Yordan Lechkov, giving them a 2–1 win. In the semi-finals, they controversially lost 2–1 to Italy. Stoichkov scored Bulgaria's only goal in the first half to tally his seventh goal, which led the tournament. In the second half, Bulgaria had penalty call waved off, when an Italian defender committed a handball in the box from a Kostadinov cross. The game ended and instead of playing in the final, it became a third-place play-off. Bulgaria played Sweden for third place, but on a rare off-day were blown away by four first half goals, losing 4–0. Bulgaria's fourth place finish remains their best ever performance in the World Cup as of 2026.

Hristo Stoichkov was awarded the Golden Boot shared with Oleg Salenko as the top scorer in the tournament with his six goals. Krasimir Balakov was named in the 1994 World Cup Dream Team along with Stoichkov. Later on in December, Stoichkov was awarded the 1994 Ballon d'Or trophy for his great skill and leadership, becoming the first Bulgarian and third Barcelona player to win it in history.

In 1996, the team qualified for the European Football Championship for the first time. They were drawn in Group B with France, Spain, and Romania. Bulgaria started with a 1–1 draw against Spain. Stoichkov has a second goal, a volley, ruled offside. Bulgaria defeated Romania 1–0 in the next group stage match. Stoichkov scored in the third minute. In the final group match, the Bulgarian side lost 3–1 against France; Stoichkov scored a free kick to give Bulgaria their only goal of the game, along with their only loss. At the same time, Spain defeated Romania 2–1, and Bulgaria were eliminated.

Bulgaria qualified for the 1998 World Cup in France by finishing first in Group 5, with decisive wins over Russia. They entered the competition with new manager Hristo Bonev. Bulgaria drew Spain, Nigeria, and Paraguay in Group D. The first match ended decently, in a goalless draw against eventual group runners-up Paraguay – a game the Bulgarians more than held their own in. In the second match, the Bulgarians lost 1–0 for a second-straight World Cup to Nigeria. The final match ended with a 6–1 defeat to Spain – a game both sides had to win and in which time finally caught up with the Bulgarians, against a talented Spanish team who only began to play in the final game. Following the bad results, Bulgaria finished fourth in the group, with only one point. This was the last World Cup appearance for Bulgaria.

Bulgaria was drawn in a tough group with England, Sweden, and Poland in qualification for Euro 2000. The campaign started slow with a draw and a defeat by Poland and Sweden. The most memorable match for Bulgaria in the group was the 1–1 draw against England, which was also the last match for Stoichkov before his international retirement. Bulgaria finished fourth with eight points and failed to make the final stages of the competition.

=== Early 21st century ===
Bulgaria was once again drawn into a tough group with Denmark and Czech Republic. The group was also the debut of Bulgaria's top-scoring legend Dimitar Berbatov. Bulgaria won the matches against the weaker teams, but lost once and drew once with both Denmark and the Czech Republic. Bulgaria finished third with 17 points, three points behind second-placed Czech Republic, thus failing to make the World Cup in South Korea and Japan.

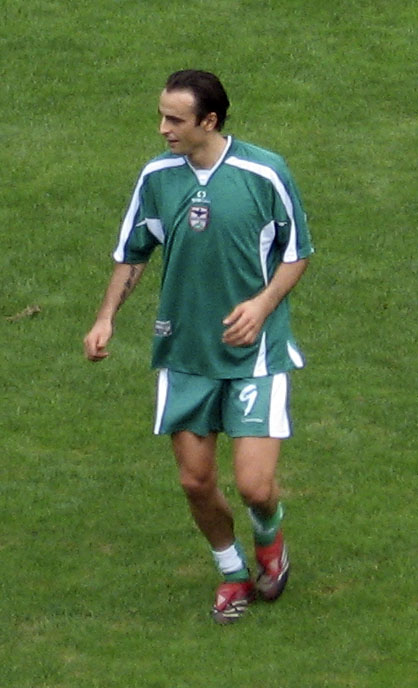
Berbatov training in Bulgaria after leading them to their final major tournament, Euro 2004

Bulgaria managed to qualify for the Euro 2004 in Portugal by finishing first with wins over Croatia and Belgium. They drew Sweden, Italy, and Denmark in Group C. All three group stage matches ended up in losses for Bulgaria. Sweden thrashed them 5-0 in the opener, while the 2-0 defeat to Denmark was only marginally better. However in the final game Martin Petrov became the team's lone scorer in the country's 1–2 loss to Italy - a game only lost in the final minute.

Bulgaria failed to qualify for the World Cup in Germany after a run of poor results. They drew with Sweden and Croatia in the first fixtures, but lost the other meetings to the two sides. Although Berbatov scored many goals in the qualifiers including a last-minute equalizer against Croatia, Bulgaria finished third in qualifying with 15 points.

Bulgaria found themselves in a minor tournament in Japan known as the Kirin Cup. They started off well with a 2–1 victory over the hosts Japan. However, Bulgaria lost 5–1 to Scotland, the eventual cup champions. Bulgaria finished as the runners-up and received the silver medal.

Group G of Euro 2008 qualification had Netherlands, Romania, and Bulgaria attempting to qualify for Euro 2008, hosted by Switzerland and Austria. Bulgaria performed well after a run of good results against Romania which gave them the first place. Bulgaria finished third in the group falling short on one point behind the Netherlands.

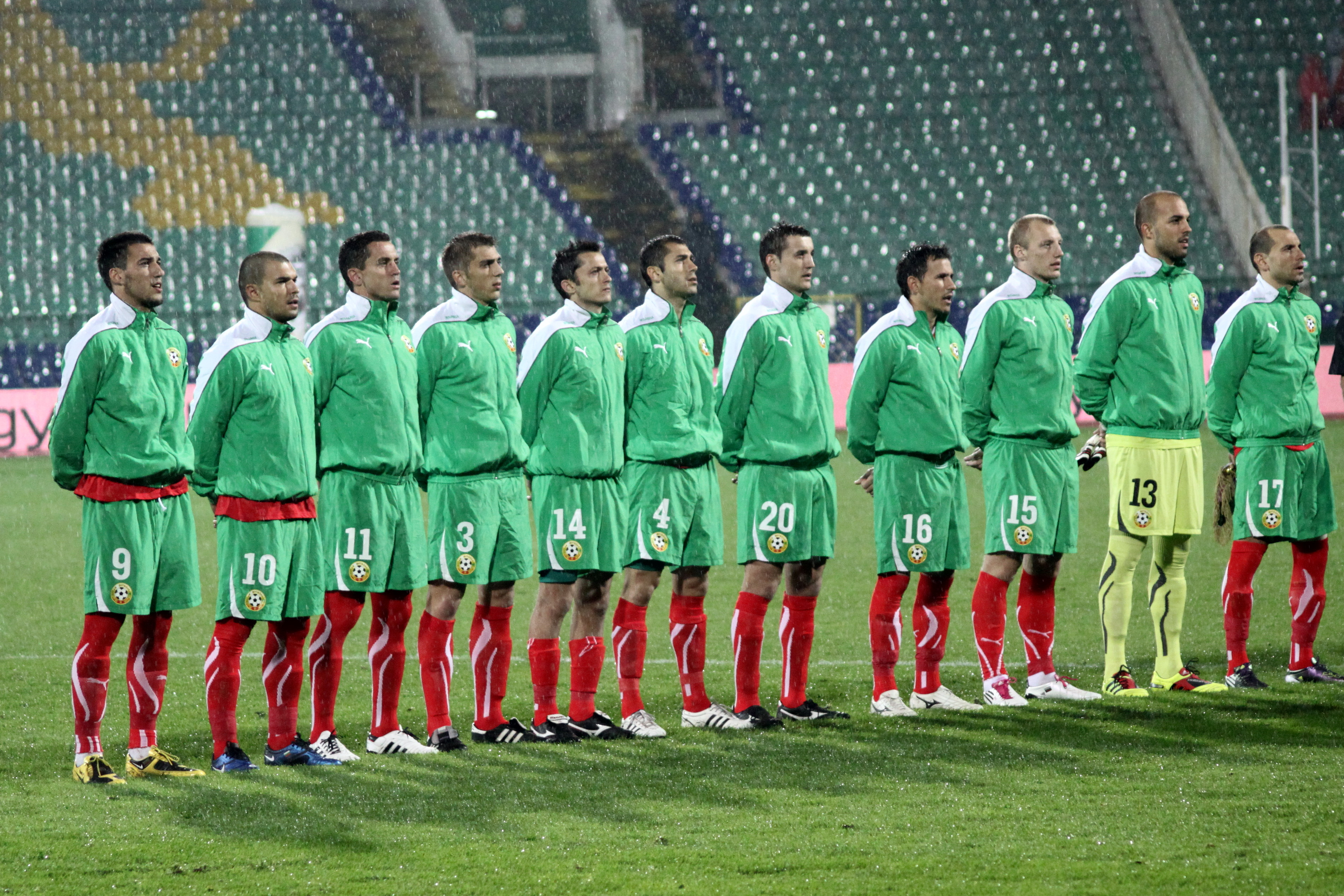
Bulgaria in 2010

Bulgaria were drawn against Italy and Ireland in qualifying in Group 8. Bulgaria started the campaign with a series of draws. Manager Plamen Markov was replaced by Stanimir Stoilov in January 2009. The Bulgarians then recorded their first wins of the group over Cyprus, Montenegro and Georgia. They finished in third place with 14 points, therefore failing to qualify to a play-off spot.

Bulgaria were drawn in Group G along with England, Switzerland, Wales, and Montenegro. Bulgaria finished in last place in the group.

In the qualification phase for the 2014 FIFA World Cup in Brazil, Bulgaria were placed in Group B together with the teams of Italy, Denmark, Czech Republic, Armenia and Malta. Under the guidance of former player Lyuboslav Penev as head coach, Bulgaria enjoyed a revival and some noteworthy performances in friendly matches before the start of the qualifying, including a 2–1 victory over 2010 World Cup runners-up Netherlands in Amsterdam. The qualifying began with a 2–2 draw against Euro 2012 runners-up Italy. Bulgaria then edged a tight match against Armenia, which ended 1–0. Next, Bulgaria drew 1–1 against Denmark. Four days later, Bulgaria earned a hard-fought 0–0 draw away to the Czech Republic. As a result, the team climbed from 96th in the FIFA World Rankings, their lowest position in history, to 40th in November 2012.

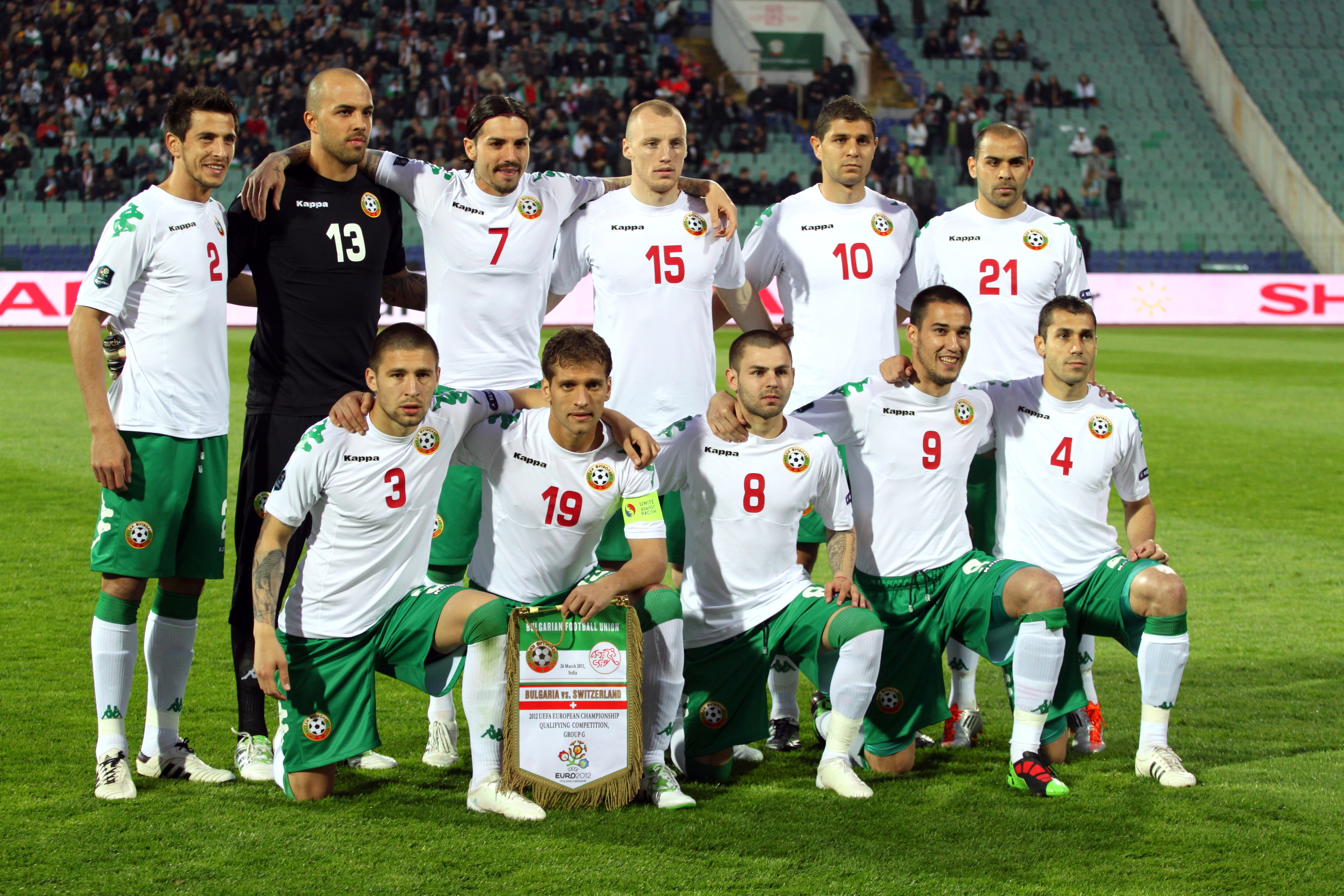
The national team in 2012

Penev's players hosted and defeated Malta 6–0 under heavy snowfall. Four days later, Bulgaria drew Denmark 1–1 in Copenhagen. This result left Bulgaria second in the group with 10 points, still undefeated. Bulgaria traveled to Italy, losing 1–0. After a series of poor results, Bulgaria ended up failing to qualify for Brazil 2014.

Bulgaria were placed in a group with Italy, Croatia, Norway, Azerbaijan, and Malta. Bulgaria opened up their first match with a 2–1 victory over Azerbaijan. They were defeated 1–0 by Croatia, following another 2–1 defeat to Norway. To make it worse, Bulgaria drew with Malta 1–1 at home, which would cost manager Lyuboslav Penev his position. He was replaced by Ludogorets Razgrad manager Ivaylo Petev.

On his debut match, Petev's squad drew Romania 0-0; this later led to a 2–2 draw with Italy, which Bulgaria led until a last-minute Italian equalizer. Bulgaria defeated Malta 1–0 to edge two points ever closer to the third place playoff position. After a series of losses, Bulgaria failed to qualify for Euro 2016 in France despite a 2–0 defeat of Azerbaijan.

Bulgaria were drawn in a strong World Cup qualification group with the Netherlands, France, Sweden, Belarus and Luxembourg. They began with a 4–3 win against Luxembourg at home. This was followed by heavy losses to France (4–1) and Sweden (3–0). In November 2016, the Lions beat Belarus in Sofia 1–0, and then put up one of their best performances in recent years, beating the Netherlands 2–0 to move into third place in the group. Bulgaria then beat the group leaders Sweden 3–2 in Sofia to move one point behind their opponents in the table. However, they lost the match against the Netherlands at the Amsterdam Arena 3–1. A 1–0 defeat at home to France and a 1–1 draw in Luxembourg ended their chances of qualifying.

=== 2018–present ===
Bulgaria were drawn in UEFA Nations League C with Norway, Slovenia and Cyprus. Bulgaria opened up the campaign with a 2–1 win over Slovenia and a clean sheet against Norway. The Norwegians eventually avenged their loss to Bulgaria, resulting in a tie for first place. Bulgaria eventually closed out the second round of games with two 1–1 draws against Slovenia and Cyprus, resulting in a second-place finish.

Bulgaria was drawn in Group A with England, Czech Republic, Montenegro and Kosovo. The team began the qualifying campaign with a 1–1 home draw against Montenegro and a 1–1 away draw to Kosovo while losing three major players due to injuries. They later carried on with two more losses which sparked the end of their group campaign. Despite finishing in fourth place, the national side had one more opportunity to qualify for the Euros thanks to the good performance in the Nations League. It sent Bulgaria to the Path A qualifying play-offs, which also included Hungary, Iceland and Romania.

The draw put Bulgaria against Hungary in their first play-off match on their quest to qualify for a major competition since 2004. However, in front of limited number of home fans, Bulgaria fell 1–3 to Hungary, and was eliminated from the tournament.

After appointing Georgi Dermendzhiev as their new head coach, Bulgaria began their brief promotion in League B. Being drawn into Group 4 with Wales, Finland and Republic of Ireland, Bulgaria played its first match against Ireland. A near victory for the Bulgarians until a 90th minute injury time equalizer sealed the draw for the Irish. Bulgaria would then play away to Wales, where they held the hosts leveled 0–0 until another 90th minute injury time goal that resulted in 0–1 loss. The problems would continue with another set of narrow losses to Finland and Wales, forcing Bulgaria to miss out on promotion to League A. With two more matches left, Bulgaria finished winless against Finland and Ireland, relegating the Lions to League C.

Yasen Petrov was hired as the coach prior to the qualifiers for the 2022 World Cup. Bulgaria began the campaign horribly, losing at home 1–3 to Switzerland and 0–2 to Italy. The team somewhat improved in the next two games, drawing away at Northern Ireland and Italy, the reigning European champions. Bulgaria then beat Lithuania 1–0 at home, but lost 1–3 away against the same team, ending their hopes for qualification. A 2–1 home win against Northern Ireland was only a brief moment of rejoice before a heavy 0–4 defeat to Switzerland ended a largely miserable attempt for qualifying.

Bulgaria was allocated to League C for the 2022–23 Nations League season, after relegation from the previous edition. Bulgaria's opponents were drawn to be North Macedonia, Georgia and Gibraltar. The campaign began with a 1–1 draw against North Macedonia at home, followed by a heavy 2–5 loss against Georgia at home. Yasen Petrov handed his resignation following the game. Georgi Ivanov was appointed as interim manager for the next two games against Gibraltar and Georgia. Another shameful performance followed, when the Lions drew 1–1 in Gibraltar, which was one of only few times that the Gibraltar national team had not lost a competitive game in its history. In Georgia, Bulgaria drew 0–0, extending the winless streak to four games. During the one month pause of the tournament, Serbian Mladen Krstajić was appointed as manager. Under his reins, Bulgaria recorded two wins against Gibraltar at home and North Macedonia away, eventually finishing second in the group. The game against North Macedonia was particularly intense, due to rising political tensions between the two countries at that time. The Bulgarian national anthem was heavily booed, followed by multiple provocations from both Macedonian fans and players aimed at the Bulgarian team.

Bulgaria had a rough Euro 2024 qualifying campaign finishing in the lower half of their group. The group consisted of Hungary, Serbia, Montenegro and Lithuania. The poor run for Bulgaria resulted in the Bulgarian Football Union to appoint Ilian Iliev as new manager. Iliev started off his first two matches leading Bulgaria to draws against Serbia and Hungary, both games ending with a 2–2 score. With Iliev at the helm, Bulgaria have remained unbeaten in all their matches for nearly a year.

Bulgaria were drawn in Group 3 of the UEFA Nations League C division with Northern Ireland, Belarus and Luxembourg. Despite having a successful campaign with a win over powerful contenders, Northern Ireland, they ultimately finished in second. Qualifying themselves to League B playoffs, Bulgaria faced the Republic of Ireland in a two legged set of matches. Bulgaria narrowly lost both matches by the score of 2–1, resulting in no League B promotion.

== Team image ==
Bulgaria's traditional colours are white, green and red, taken from the colours of the country's flag. This tricolour is reflected through the use of white shirts, green shorts, and red socks. The team's away kits have usually been red.

Their nickname is The Lions, in tribute of the lions represented in the coat of arms of Bulgaria.

=== Colours ===
Bulgarian tri-color flag

Coat of arms of Bulgaria

=== Kit sponsorship ===
Supplier	Period
(Bulgaria) BFU	1922–1974
(Germany) Adidas	1974–1994
(Germany) Puma	1995–2010
(Italy) Kappa	2011–2014
(Spain) Joma	2015–2022
(Italy) Macron	2023–

=== Ultras and controversy ===
In recent years, ultras of the Bulgarian team have developed a reputation for racism. After racist chanting and monkey noises directed at Ashley Young, Ashley Cole and Theo Walcott during a qualifier for Euro 2012, the Bulgarian Football Union was fined €40,000 by UEFA. The BFU denied that racism would be an issue during Euro 2020 qualifiers, claiming that the issue was worse in England. Nevertheless, Bulgarian ultras were accused of racist chants during their matches against Czech Republic, Kosovo and England. As a result, part of the Bulgarian stadium was closed off for the match against England (October 2019), and officials twice halted the game under the UEFA anti-racism protocol. In the following days since the match took place, Bulgarian police identified 15 fans they suspected were responsible for subjecting black English players including Raheem Sterling, Marcus Rashford and Tyrone Mings to racist abuse, arresting six of them.

UEFA president Aleksander Ceferin condemned the alleged abuse calling on the "football family and governments" to "wage war on the racists". Disciplinary proceedings have been launched against both Bulgaria and England.

== Home stadium ==
Traditionally, the Bulgaria national football team's home stadium is the Vasil Levski National Stadium with a capacity of 44,000. The stadium was officially opened in 1953 and reconstructed in 1966 and 2002. It is the second largest stadium in Bulgaria, behind the Plovdiv Stadium with a capacity of 55,000. During the 2006–07 UEFA Champions League, the stadium was used for Levski Sofia matches with Barcelona, Chelsea, and Werder Bremen. Similarly, Ludogorets Razgrad used it as their main home venue for their European matches until the 2017–18 season. The Bulgaria national team's home matches, Bulgarian Cup finals and the Eternal derby of Bulgaria are held at the venue, as well as athletics competitions. The Huvepharma Arena in Razgrad has been occasionally hosting the national team's matches since 2018. Opened in 1954 and renovated in 2011, the stadium has a capacity of ~11,000. Another stadium that is used for the national team's matches is the freshly renovated Hristo Botev Stadium in Plovdiv, with a capacity of ~20,000.

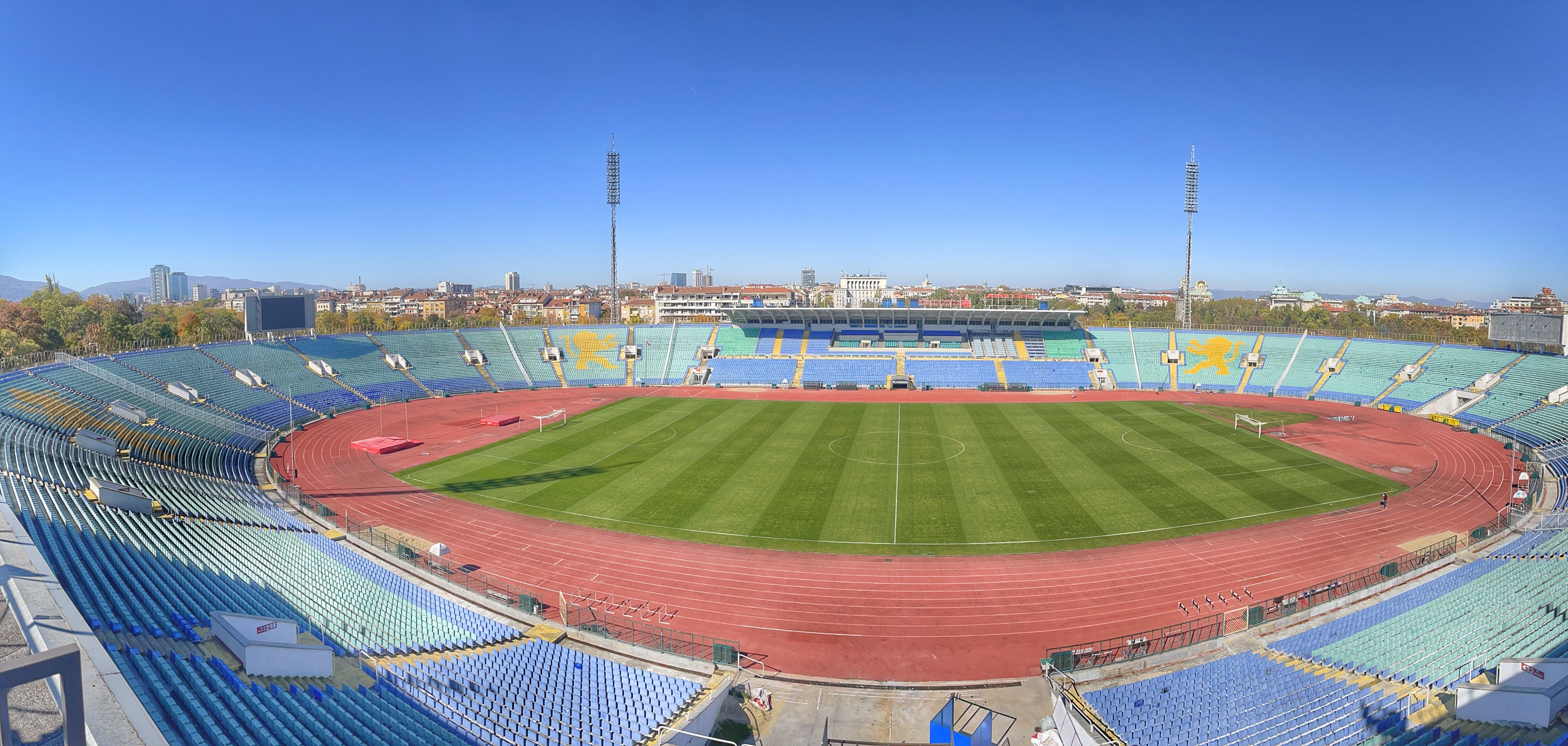
Vasil Levski National Stadium

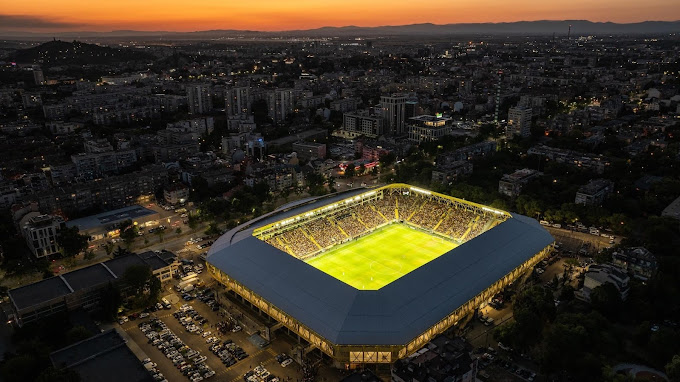
Hristo Botev Stadium

== Results and fixtures ==
The following is a list of match results in the last 12 months, as well as any future matches that have been scheduled.

Win Draw Loss Fixture

=== 2026 ===
27 March 2026 FIFA Series	Solomon Islands	2–10	Bulgaria	Jakarta, Indonesia
15:30 UTC+7	Lea'i 29' (pen.), 70'	Report	M. Petkov 5', 45+2'; Yordanov 13' (pen.); Krastev 39', 44'; Nikolov 53', 81', 90+3'; Rusev 63' (pen.); Balov 65'	Stadium: Gelora Bung Karno Stadium; Attendance: 2,248; Referee: Naufal Adya Fairuski (Indonesia)

30 March 2026 FIFA Series	Indonesia	0–1	Bulgaria	Jakarta, Indonesia
20:00 UTC+7		Report	M. Petkov 38' (pen.)	Stadium: Gelora Bung Karno Stadium; Attendance: 24,174; Referee: Nazmi Nasaruddin (Malaysia)

1 June Friendly	Bulgaria	0–1	Montenegro	Plovdiv, Bulgaria
19:00 UTC+3		Report	Sekulić 68'	Stadium: Hristo Botev Stadium; Attendance: 2,323; Referee: Ioannis Papadopoulos (Greece)

5 June Friendly	Moldova	2–2	Bulgaria	Chișinău, Moldova
20:00 UTC+3	Bogaciuc 60'; Baboglo 85'	Report	Rusev 23'; M. Petkov 76'	Stadium: Zimbru Stadium; Attendance: 3,613; Referee: Tural Qurbanov (Azerbaijan)

26 September 2026–27 Nations League	Bulgaria	1–2	Luxembourg	Plovdiv, Bulgaria
19:00 UTC+3	Chandarov 18'	Report	Barreiro 37'; V. Thill 65'	Stadium: Hristo Botev Stadium; Attendance: 4,300; Referee: Sander van der Eijk (Netherlands)

29 September 2026–27 Nations League	Bulgaria	0–0	Estonia	Plovdiv, Bulgaria
21:45 UTC+3		Report		Stadium: Hristo Botev Stadium; Attendance: 960; Referee: Goga Kikacheishvili (Georgia)

3 October 2026–27 Nations League	Iceland	3–0	Bulgaria	Reykjavík, Iceland
16:00 UTC+0	Óskarsson 37', 60'; Ellertsson 90'	Report		Stadium: Laugardalsvöllur; Attendance: 5,069; Referee: Balázs Berke (Hungary)

6 October 2026–27 Nations League	Luxembourg	0–2	Bulgaria	Luxembourg City, Luxembourg
20:45 UTC+2		Report	Balov 19'; A. Iliev 34'	Stadium: Stade de Luxembourg; Attendance: 8,027; Referee: Andris Treimanis (Latvia)

13 November 2026–27 Nations League	Bulgaria	0–5	Iceland	Plovdiv, Bulgaria
21:45 UTC+2		Report	Guðjohnsen 17' (pen.), 68', 79'; Óskarsson 21'; Tsenov 52' (o.g.)	Stadium: Hristo Botev Stadium; Attendance: 1,150; Referee: Florian Badstübner (Germany)

16 November 2026–27 Nations League	Estonia	2–1	Bulgaria	Tallinn, Estonia
19:00 UTC+2	Kristal 8'; Palumets 60'	Report	Kovachev 45+1'	Stadium: Lilleküla Stadium; Attendance: 8,006; Referee: Nenad Minaković (Serbia)

== Coaching staff ==
Role	Name
Head coach	(Bulgaria) Vacant
Assistant coach	(Bulgaria) Vacant
Assistant coach	(Bulgaria) Vacant
Goalkeeping coach	(Bulgaria) Vacant
Fitness coach	(Bulgaria) Vacant
Analyst	(Bulgaria) Vacant

=== Coaching history ===
- (Austria) Leopold Nitsch (1922–1924)
- (Austria) Willibald Stejskal (1925–1926)
- (Bulgaria) Pavel Grozdanov (1927–1930)
- (Hungary) Carl Nemes (1930–1931)
- (Germany) Otto Feist (1931–1932)
- (Bulgaria) Pavel Grozdanov (1932–1933)
- (Hungary) Károly Fogl (1934–1935)
- (Bulgaria) Nikola Kalkandzhiev (1935–1936)
- (Bulgaria) Ivan Batandzhiev (1936)
- (Bulgaria) Geno Mateev (1936–1937)
- (Czechoslovakia) Stanislav Toms (1937–1938)
- (Bulgaria) Kostantin Maznikov (1938–1939)
- (Bulgaria) Ivan Radoev (1939–1940)
- (Austria) Franz Köhler (1940–1941)
- (Bulgaria) Ivan Radoev (1941–1942)
- (Bulgaria) Ivan Batandzhiev (1943–1945)
- (Bulgaria) Todor Konov (1945–1946)
- (Bulgaria) Mihail Manov (1947)
- (Bulgaria) Ivan Radoev (1947)
- (Hungary) Rezső Somlai (1947–1948)
- (Bulgaria) Lubomir Angelov (1948)
- (Hungary) Andor Hajdú (1948–1949)
- (Bulgaria) Ivan Radoev (1950)
- (Bulgaria) Lubomir Angelov (1950)
- (Hungary) Andor Hajdú (1950)
- (Bulgaria) Lubomir Angelov (1950–1953)
- (Bulgaria) Stoyan Ormandzhiev (1950–1953)
- (Bulgaria) Krum Milev (1954–1960)
- (Bulgaria) Georgi Pachedzhiev (1955–1962)
- (Bulgaria) Stoyan Ormandzhiev (1963)
- (Hungary) Béla Volentik (1963–1965)
- (Czechoslovakia) Rudolf Vytlačil (1965–1966)
- (Bulgaria) Dobromir Tashkov (1966–1967)
- (Bulgaria) Stefan Bozhkov (1967–1970)
- (Bulgaria) Vasil Spasov (1970–1972)
- (Bulgaria) Hristo Mladenov (1972–1974)
- (Bulgaria) Stoyan Ormandzhiev (1974–1977)
- (Bulgaria) Tsvetan Ilchev (1978–1980)
- (Bulgaria) Atanas Purzhelov (1980–1982)
- (Bulgaria) Ivan Vutsov (1982–1986)
- (Bulgaria) Hristo Mladenov (1986–1987)
- (Bulgaria) Boris Angelov (1988–1989)
- (Bulgaria) Ivan Vutsov (1989–1991)
- (Bulgaria) Dimitar Penev (1991–1996)
- (Bulgaria) Hristo Bonev (1996–1998)
- (Bulgaria) Dimitar Dimitrov (1998–1999)
- (Bulgaria) Stoycho Mladenov (2000–2001)
- (Bulgaria) Plamen Markov (2002–2004)
- (Bulgaria) Hristo Stoichkov (2004–2007)
- (Bulgaria) Stanimir Stoilov (2007)
- (Bulgaria) Dimitar Penev (2007)
- (Bulgaria) Plamen Markov (2007–2008)
- (Bulgaria) Stanimir Stoilov (2009–2010)
- (Germany) Lothar Matthäus (2010–2011)
- (Bulgaria) Mihail Madanski (2011)
- (Bulgaria) Lyuboslav Penev (2011–2014)
- (Bulgaria) Ivaylo Petev (2015–2016)
- (Bulgaria) Petar Hubchev (2016–2019)
- (Bulgaria) Krasimir Balakov (2019)
- (Bulgaria) Georgi Dermendzhiev (2019–2020)
- (Bulgaria) Yasen Petrov (2021–2022)
- (Bulgaria) Georgi Ivanov (2022)
- (Serbia) Mladen Krstajić (2022–2023)
- (Bulgaria) Ilian Iliev (2023–2025)
- (Bulgaria) Aleksandar Dimitrov (2025–2026)
- (Bulgaria) Atanas Ribarski (2026–)

== Players ==
=== Current squad ===
The following players were called up for the UEFA Nations League games against Iceland on 13 November and Estonia on 16 November 2026.

Caps and goals as of 16 November 2026, after the match against Estonia.

No.	Pos.	Player	Date of birth (age)	Caps	Goals	Club
1	GK	Daniel Naumov	29 March 1998 (age 28)	17	0	(Bulgarian Football Union) Botev Plovdiv
12	GK	Aleks Bozhev	19 July 2005 (age 21)	0	0	(Bulgarian Football Union) CSKA 1948
23	GK	Plamen Andreev	15 December 2004 (age 21)	1	0	(Hungarian Football Federation) Debrecen
2	DF	Rosen Bozhinov	23 January 2005 (age 21)	6	0	(Italian Football Federation) Pisa
3	DF	Emil Tsenov	26 April 2002 (age 24)	10	0	(Russian Football Union) Orenburg
6	DF	Hristiyan Petrov	24 June 2002 (age 24)	15	0	(Royal Dutch Football Association) Heerenveen
13	DF	Stefan Velkov	12 December 1996 (age 29)	8	0	(Danish Football Association) Sønderjyske
19	DF	Ivan Turitsov	18 July 1999 (age 27)	27	0	(Georgian Football Federation) Dinamo Batumi
21	DF	Dimitar Velkovski	22 January 1995 (age 31)	18	0	(Bulgarian Football Union) Arda
22	DF	Yoni Stoyanov	22 May 2001 (age 25)	13	0	(Israel Football Association) Hapoel Be'er Sheva
	DF	Valentin Antov	9 November 2000 (age 26)	34	2	(Italian Football Federation) Monza
	DF	Simeon Shishkov	18 May 2006 (age 20)	1	0	(Bulgarian Football Union) Ludogorets Razgrad
4	MF	Ilia Gruev	6 May 2000 (age 26)	33	0	(The Football Association) Leeds United
5	MF	Ivan Pankov	12 November 2005 (age 21)	1	0	(Cyprus Football Association) AEK Larnaca
8	MF	Andrian Kraev	14 February 1999 (age 27)	24	1	(Israel Football Association) Hapoel Tel Aviv
10	MF	Asen Chandarov	13 November 1998 (age 28)	3	1	(Bulgarian Football Union) Botev Plovdiv
11	MF	Georgi Rusev	2 July 1998 (age 28)	29	4	(Bulgarian Football Union) CSKA 1948
18	MF	Ivaylo Chochev	18 February 1993 (age 33)	53	4	(Bulgarian Football Union) Ludogorets Razgrad
7	FW	Kristiyan Balov	26 July 2006 (age 20)	4	2	(Football Association of Serbia) Red Star Belgrade
9	FW	Atanas Iliev	9 October 1994 (age 32)	20	4	(Bulgarian Football Union) CSKA 1948
15	FW	Georgi Lazarov	5 October 2004 (age 22)	2	0	(Bulgarian Football Union) Cherno More Varna
16	FW	Marin Petkov	2 October 2003 (age 23)	31	7	(Saudi Arabian Football Federation) Al Taawoun
17	FW	Svetoslav Kovachev	14 March 1998 (age 28)	6	1	(Bulgarian Football Union) Arda
20	FW	Lukas Petkov	1 November 2000 (age 26)	15	0	(German Football Association) SV Elversberg

=== Recent call-ups ===
The following players have also been called up to the Bulgarian squad within the last 12 months and are still available for selection.

Pos.	Player	Date of birth (age)	Caps	Goals	Club	Latest call-up
GK	Dimitar Mitov	22 January 1997 (age 29)	15	0	(Germany) FC St. Pauli	v. Luxembourg, 6 October 2026
GK	Dimitar Sheytanov	15 March 1999 (age 27)	2	0	(Bulgaria) CSKA 1948	v. Moldova, 5 June 2026
GK	Martin Velichkov	19 September 1999 (age 27)	2	0	(Bulgaria) Lokomotiv Sofia	v. Moldova, 5 June 2026
DF	Teodor Ivanov	13 March 2004 (age 22)	4	0	(Bulgaria) CSKA Sofia	v. Iceland, 13 November 2026^{INJ}
DF	Kristian Dimitrov	27 February 1997 (age 29)	28	1	(Bulgaria) Levski Sofia	v. Luxembourg, 6 October 2026
DF	Andrea Hristov	1 March 1999 (age 27)	15	1	(Portugal) Vizela	v. Luxembourg, 6 October 2026
DF	Patrik-Gabriel Galchev	14 April 2001 (age 25)	8	0	Free agent	v. Moldova, 5 June 2026
DF	Martin Georgiev	24 September 2005 (age 21)	4	0	(Greece) AEK Athens	v. Moldova, 5 June 2026
DF	Petko Hristov	1 March 1999 (age 27)	22	0	(Bulgaria) Levski Sofia	2026 FIFA Series
DF	Aleks Petkov	25 July 1999 (age 27)	17	0	(Greece) Kifisia	2026 FIFA Series^{INJ}
MF	Petko Panayotov	20 July 2005 (age 21)	6	0	(Bulgaria) CSKA Sofia	v. Luxembourg, 6 October 2026
MF	Kristiyan Stoyanov	29 March 2003 (age 23)	6	0	(Bulgaria) Slavia Sofia	v. Luxembourg, 6 October 2026
MF	Nikola Iliev	6 June 2004 (age 22)	11	0	(Bulgaria) Septemvri Sofia	v. Moldova, 5 June 2026
MF	Berk Beyhan	29 October 2004 (age 22)	2	0	(Bulgaria) Cherno More	v. Moldova, 5 June 2026
MF	Efe Ali	3 January 2003 (age 23)	1	0	(Bulgaria) Lokomotiv Plovdiv	v. Moldova, 5 June 2026
MF	Filip Krastev	15 October 2001 (age 25)	30	4	(Netherlands) PEC Zwolle	2026 FIFA Series
MF	Dominik Yankov	28 July 2000 (age 26)	18	0	(Bulgaria) Arda	2026 FIFA Series
FW	Martin Minchev	22 April 2001 (age 25)	33	0	(Poland) Cracovia	v. Iceland, 13 November 2026^{INJ}
FW	Vladimir Nikolov	7 February 2001 (age 25)	15	3	(Bulgaria) Slavia Sofia	v. Luxembourg, 6 October 2026
FW	Zdravko Dimitrov	24 August 1998 (age 28)	14	0	(Turkey) Mardin 1969	v. Luxembourg, 6 October 2026
FW	Stanislav Ivanov	16 April 1999 (age 27)	8	0	(Bulgaria) Arda	v. Luxembourg, 6 October 2026
FW	Borislav Tsonev	29 April 1995 (age 31)	8	0	(Bulgaria) CSKA 1948	v. Luxembourg, 6 October 2026
FW	Tonislav Yordanov	27 November 1998 (age 27)	3	1	(Hungary) Kisvárda	v. Moldova, 5 June 2026
Notes: ^{INJ} = Player withdrew from the current squad due to injury.; ^{U21} = Not part of the squad due to U-21 call up.; ^{PRE} = Preliminary squad.; ^{RET} = Player had announced retirement from international football.; ^{SUS} = Player is serving a suspension.; ^{PRV} = Player absent due to private circumstances.; ^{WD} = Withdrawn.

== Player records ==
As of 10 September 2019.

Players in bold text are still active with Bulgaria.

=== Most appearances ===
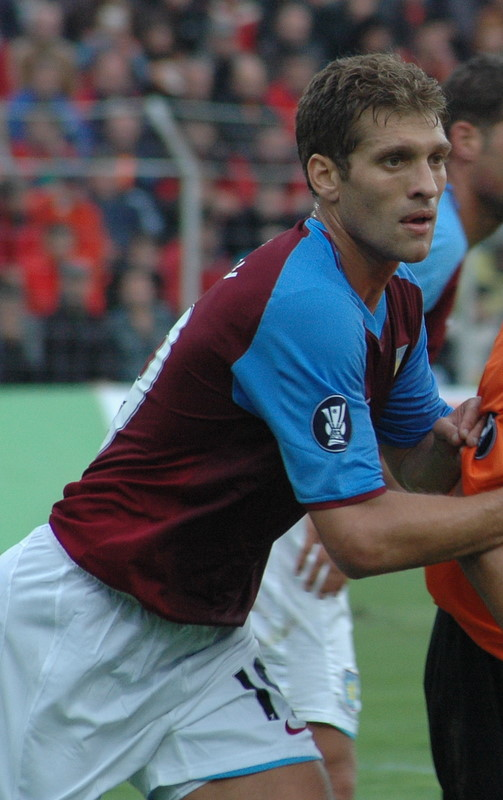
Stiliyan Petrov is Bulgaria's most capped player with 105 appearances.

Rank	Name	Caps	Goals	Career
1	Stiliyan Petrov	105	8	1998–2011
2	Borislav Mihaylov	102	0	1983–1998
3	Hristo Bonev	96	48	1967–1979
4	Krasimir Balakov	92	16	1988–2003
5	Dimitar Penev	90	2	1965–1974
5	Martin Petrov	90	19	1999–2011
5	Ivelin Popov	90	18	2007–2019
8	Radostin Kishishev	88	1	1996–2009
9	Hristo Stoichkov	83	37	1986–1999
10	Dimitar Berbatov	78	48	1999–2010
10	Nasko Sirakov	78	24	1983–1996

=== Top goalscorers ===
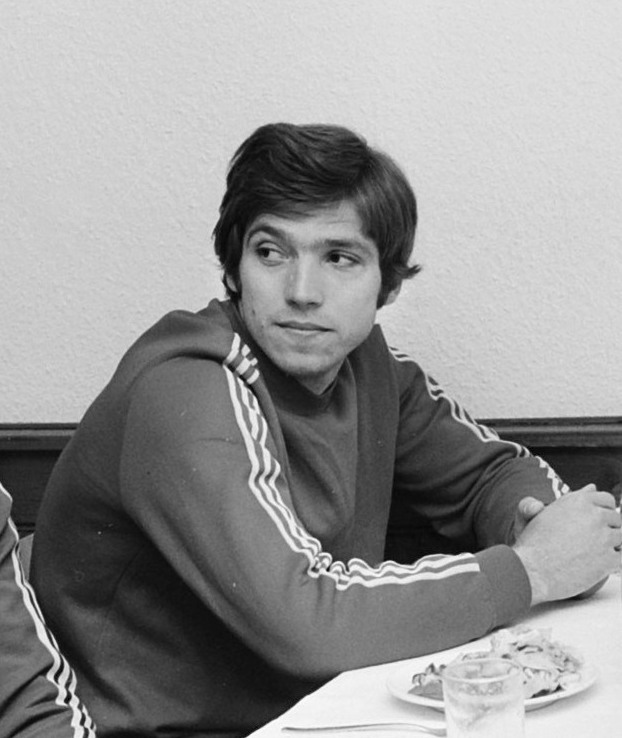
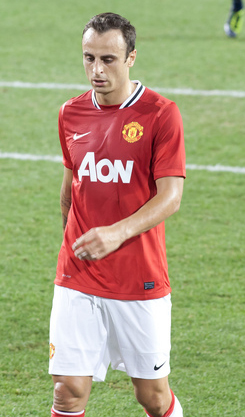
Hristo Bonev and Dimitar Berbatov are Bulgaria's joint all-time top scorers with 48 goals.

Rank	Name	Goals	Caps	Ratio	Career
1	Dimitar Berbatov	48	78	0.62	1999–2010
1	Hristo Bonev	48	96	0.5	1967–1979
3	Hristo Stoichkov	37	83	0.45	1987–1999
4	Emil Kostadinov	27	70	0.39	1988–1998
5	Lyubomir Angelov	26	44	0.59	1931–1940
6	Petar Zhekov	25	44	0.57	1963–1972
6	Ivan Kolev	25	75	0.33	1950–1963
8	Nasko Sirakov	24	78	0.31	1983–1996
9	Atanas Mihaylov	23	45	0.51	1970–1981
10	Dimitar Milanov	19	39	0.49	1948–1959
10	Georgi Asparuhov	19	49	0.39	1962–1970
10	Dinko Dermendzhiev	19	58	0.33	1966–1977
10	Martin Petrov	19	90	0.21	1999–2011

=== Youngest debutants ===
As of 15 November 2021.

Rank	Name	Age of debut	Opponent	Year
1	Vladimir Todorov	15 years 08 months 14 days	Romania	1929
2	Aleksandar Belokapov	15 years 10 months 11 days	Germany	1939
3	Georgi Sokolov	16 years 10 months 24 days	Netherlands	1959
4	Radoslav Maznikov	17 years 02 months 12 days	Romania	1929
5	Nikola Staykov	17 years 07 months 28 days	Yugoslavia	1926
6	Nikolay Mihaylov	17 years 10 months 13 days	Scotland	2006
7	**Martin Minchev**	17 years 11 months 00 days	Montenegro	2019
8	Hristo Minkovski	17 years 11 months 17 days	Romania	1929
9	Nikola Savov	18 years 01 month 10 days	Hungary	1934
10	Krasimir Chomakov	18 years 01 month 12 days	Uzbekistan	1995

== Competitive record ==
=== FIFA World Cup ===
Champions Runners-up Third place Fourth place

FIFA World Cup record										Qualification record					
Year	Result	Position	Pld	W	D	L	GF	GA	Squad	Pld	W	D	L	GF	GA
(Uruguay) 1930	Did not enter									Declined invitation					
(Italy) 1934	Did not qualify									3	0	0	3	3	14
(France) 1938	Did not qualify									2	0	1	1	1	7
(Brazil) 1950	Did not enter									Declined participation					
(Switzerland) 1954	Did not qualify									4	0	1	3	3	7
(Sweden) 1958	Did not qualify									4	2	0	2	11	7
(Chile) 1962	Group stage	15th	3	0	1	2	1	7	Squad	5	4	0	1	7	4
(England) 1966	Group stage	15th	3	0	0	3	1	8	Squad	5	4	0	1	11	7
(Mexico) 1970	Group stage	13th	3	0	1	2	5	9	Squad	6	4	1	1	12	7
(West Germany) 1974	Group stage	12th	3	0	2	1	2	5	Squad	6	4	2	0	13	3
(Argentina) 1978	Did not qualify									4	1	2	1	5	6
(Spain) 1982	Did not qualify									8	4	1	3	11	10
(Mexico) 1986	Round of 16	15th	4	0	2	2	2	6	Squad	8	5	1	2	13	5
(Italy) 1990	Did not qualify									6	1	1	4	6	8
(United States) 1994	Fourth place	4th	7	3	1	3	10	11	Squad	10	6	2	2	19	10
(France) 1998	Group stage	29th	3	0	1	2	1	7	Squad	8	6	0	2	18	9
(South Korea) (Japan) 2002	Did not qualify									10	5	2	3	14	15
(Germany) 2006	Did not qualify									10	4	3	3	17	17
(South Africa) 2010	Did not qualify									10	3	5	2	17	13
(Brazil) 2014	Did not qualify									10	3	4	3	14	9
(Russia) 2018	Did not qualify									10	4	1	5	14	19
(Qatar) 2022	Did not qualify									8	2	2	4	6	14
(Canada) (Mexico) (United States) 2026	Did not qualify									6	1	0	5	3	19
(Morocco) (Portugal) (Spain) 2030	To be determined									To be determined					
(Saudi Arabia) 2034	To be determined									To be determined					
Total	Fourth place	7/23	26	3	8	15	22	53	—	143	63	29	51	218	210

Bulgaria's World Cup history
First match	Argentina 1–0 Bulgaria (Rancagua, Chile; 30 May 1962)
Biggest win	Bulgaria 4–0 Greece (Chicago, United States; 26 June 1994)
Biggest defeat	Hungary 6–1 Bulgaria (Rancagua, Chile; 3 June 1962)
Best result	Fourth place (1994)
Worst result	Group stage (1966)

*Draws include knockout matches decided on penalty kicks.

=== UEFA European Championship ===
UEFA European Championship record										Qualifying record					
Year	Result	Position	Pld	W	D	L	GF	GA	Squad	Pld	W	D	L	GF	GA
(France) 1960	Did not qualify									2	0	1	1	1	3
(Spain) 1964	Did not qualify									5	3	0	2	7	7
(Italy) 1968	Did not qualify									8	5	2	1	13	4
(Belgium) 1972	Did not qualify									6	3	1	2	11	7
(Socialist Federal Republic of Yugoslavia) 1976	Did not qualify									6	2	2	2	12	7
(Italy) 1980	Did not qualify									8	2	1	5	6	14
(France) 1984	Did not qualify									6	2	1	3	7	8
(West Germany) 1988	Did not qualify									8	4	2	2	12	6
(Sweden) 1992	Did not qualify									8	3	3	2	15	8
(England) 1996	Group stage	11th	3	1	1	1	3	4	Squad	10	7	1	2	24	10
(Belgium) (Netherlands) 2000	Did not qualify									8	2	2	4	6	8
(Portugal) 2004	Group stage	16th	3	0	0	3	1	9	Squad	8	5	2	1	13	4
(Austria) (Switzerland) 2008	Did not qualify									12	7	4	1	18	7
(Poland) (Ukraine) 2012	Did not qualify									8	1	2	5	3	13
(France) 2016	Did not qualify									10	3	2	5	9	12
(Europe) 2020	Did not qualify									9	1	3	5	7	20
(Germany) 2024	Did not qualify									8	0	4	4	7	14
(United Kingdom) (Republic of Ireland) 2028	To be determined									To be determined					
(Italy) (Turkey) 2032	To be determined									To be determined					
Total	Group stage	2/17	6	1	1	4	4	13	—	130	50	33	47	171	154

Bulgaria's European Championship history
First match	Spain 1–1 Bulgaria (Leeds, England; 9 June 1996)
Biggest win	Bulgaria 1–0 Romania (Newcastle, England; 13 June 1996)
Biggest defeat	Sweden 5–0 Bulgaria (Lisbon, Portugal; 14 June 2004)
Best result	Group stage (1996)
Worst result	Group stage (2004)

*Draws include knockout matches decided on penalty kicks.

=== UEFA Nations League ===
UEFA Nations League record
League phase / Play-offs											Finals								
Season	LG	Grp	Pld	W	D	L	GF	GA	P/R	RK	Year	Pos	Pld	W	D	L	GF	GA	Squad
2018–19	C	3	6	3	2	1	7	5	▲	29th	(Portugal) 2019	Not eligible							
2020–21	B	4	6	0	2	4	2	7	▼	31st	(Italy) 2021	Not eligible							
2022–23	C	4	6	2	3	1	10	8	Same position	40th	(Netherlands) 2023	Not eligible							
2024–25	C	3	8	2	3	3	5	10	Same position	39th	(Germany) 2025	Not eligible							
2026–27	C	4	6	1	1	4	4	12	Same position	44th	2027	Not eligible							
Total			32	8	11	13	28	42	29th		Total		—	—	—	—	—	—	—

Bulgaria's Nations League history
First match	Slovenia 1–2 Bulgaria (Ljubljana, Slovenia; 6 September 2018)
Biggest win	Bulgaria 5–1 Gibraltar (Razgrad, Bulgaria; 23 September 2022)
Biggest defeat	Northern Ireland 5–0 Bulgaria (Belfast, Northern Ireland; 15 October 2024)
Best result	29th place (2018–19)
Worst result	44th place (2026–27)

=== Olympic Games ===
Olympic Games record
Year	Result	Position	Pld	W	D	L	GF	GA	Squad
(United Kingdom) 1908	No national representative								
(Sweden) 1912	No national representative								
(Belgium) 1920	No national representative								
(France) 1924	Second round	12th	1	0	0	1	0	1	Squad
(Netherlands) 1928	Did not enter								
(Nazi Germany) 1936	Did not enter								
(United Kingdom) 1948	Did not enter								
(Finland) 1952	Preliminary round	13th	1	0	0	1	1	2	Squad
(Australia) 1956	Bronze medal	3rd	3	2	0	1	10	3	Squad
(Italy) 1960	Group stage	5th	3	2	1	0	8	3	Squad
(Japan) 1964	Did not qualify								
(Mexico) 1968	Silver medal	2nd	6	3	2	1	16	10	Squad
(West Germany) 1972	Did not qualify								
(Canada) 1976	Did not qualify								
(Soviet Union) 1980	Did not qualify								
(United States) 1984	Did not qualify								
(South Korea) 1988	Did not qualify								
Since 1992	Olympic football has been an under-23 tournament								
Total	1 Silver medal	5/14	14	7	3	4	35	19	—

Bulgaria's Olympic Games history
First match	Ireland 1–0 Bulgaria (Colombes, France; 28 May 1924)
Biggest win	Bulgaria 7–0 Thailand (Leon, Mexico; 14 October 1968)
Biggest defeat	Bulgaria 1–4 Hungary (Mexico City, Mexico; 26 October 1968)
Best result	Silver medal (1968)
Worst result	Second round (1924)

== Head-to-head record ==
As of 16 November 2026.

Positive Record Neutral Record Negative Record

Opponents	Pld	W	D	L	GF	GA	GD
Albania	15	7	4	4	17	12	+5
Algeria	6	3	2	1	9	6	+3
Andorra	2	2	0	0	5	1	+4
Argentina	9	1	0	8	6	18	−12
Armenia	2	1	0	1	2	2	0
Australia	4	2	2	0	8	4	+4
Austria	8	1	2	5	7	21	−14
Azerbaijan	5	3	2	0	7	3	+4
Belarus	10	5	2	3	13	8	+5
Belgium	14	6	2	6	20	23	−3
Bolivia	1	1	0	0	3	1	+2
Bosnia and Herzegovina	2	1	0	1	2	2	0
Brazil	9	0	1	8	2	19	−17
Cameroon	1	1	0	0	3	0	+3
Canada	1	0	1	0	1	1	0
Chile	1	0	0	1	2	3	−1
Croatia	9	1	2	6	6	18	−12
Cuba	1	1	0	0	5	2	+3
Cyprus	17	14	2	1	38	12	+26
Czech Republic (Note: Includes matches against Czechoslovakia.)	24	10	4	10	22	32	−10
Denmark	16	4	8	4	20	21	−1
East Germany	23	8	8	7	31	30	+1
Ecuador	2	1	0	1	3	4	−1
Egypt	7	2	2	3	8	9	−1
England	12	0	4	8	2	26	−24
Estonia	4	1	2	1	3	2	+1
Finland	10	7	1	2	20	7	+13
France	23	8	4	11	26	41	−15
Georgia	10	5	2	3	23	16	+7
Germany (Note: Includes matches against West Germany.)	24	4	2	18	28	62	−34
Ghana	1	1	0	0	10	0	+10
Gibraltar	3	2	1	0	9	2	+7
Great Britain	5	3	1	1	16	5	+11
Greece	27	13	7	7	48	39	+9
Hungary	34	6	11	17	39	75	−36
Iceland	7	4	1	2	12	15	−3
India	1	1	0	0	3	0	+3
Indonesia	2	2	0	0	5	0	+5
Iran	2	0	1	1	1	2	−1
Israel	6	4	1	1	12	5	+7
Italy	23	2	9	12	19	42	−23
Jamaica	1	0	1	0	0	0	0
Japan	6	4	1	1	13	10	+3
Jordan	1	1	0	0	2	0	+2
Kazakhstan	2	2	0	0	4	2	+2
Kosovo	2	0	1	1	3	4	−1
Kuwait	5	2	3	0	9	6	+3
Latvia	3	3	0	0	6	0	+6
Lebanon	1	1	0	0	3	2	+1
Lithuania	5	2	1	2	6	6	0
Luxembourg	19	15	3	1	43	11	+32
Malta	14	11	3	0	45	6	+39
Mexico	12	2	6	4	11	14	−3
Moldova	3	2	1	0	9	3	+6
Montenegro	9	1	4	4	9	10	–1
Morocco	6	1	3	2	5	10	−5
Netherlands	12	5	2	5	17	20	−3
New Caledonia	1	1	0	0	5	3	+2
Nigeria	2	0	0	2	0	4	−4
North Korea	3	3	0	0	12	1	+11
North Macedonia	9	5	2	2	9	4	+5
Northern Ireland	11	6	2	3	12	13	−1
Norway	16	7	4	5	27	16	+11
Oman	1	0	1	0	1	1	0
Paraguay	2	0	1	1	0	1	−1
Peru	5	2	1	2	11	11	0
Poland	27	6	9	12	32	48	−16
Portugal	13	6	3	4	18	16	+2
Qatar	2	1	0	1	4	4	0
Republic of Ireland	15	3	6	6	12	19	−7
Romania	44	13	9	22	62	82	−20
Russia (Note: Includes matches against the Soviet Union.)	28	3	11	14	23	42	−19
San Marino	2	2	0	0	7	0	+7
Saudi Arabia	3	2	0	1	3	1	+2
Scotland	6	0	3	3	4	10	−6
Serbia (Note: Includes matches against Yugoslavia and Serbia and Montenegro.)	37	9	8	20	53	74	−21
Singapore	1	1	0	0	10	2	+8
Slovakia	8	2	2	4	6	11	−5
Slovenia	5	3	2	0	9	3	+6
Solomon Islands	1	1	0	0	10	2	+8
South Africa	1	0	1	0	1	1	0
South Korea	2	1	1	0	2	1	+1
Spain	11	1	3	7	15	38	−23
Sudan	1	0	1	0	1	1	0
Sweden	16	3	2	11	11	31	−20
Switzerland	12	2	4	6	13	22	−9
Tanzania	1	1	0	0	1	0	+1
Thailand	1	1	0	0	4	0	+4
Tunisia	2	0	1	1	3	6	−3
Turkey	29	14	6	9	54	44	+10
Ukraine	6	0	3	3	3	8	−5
United Arab Emirates	6	5	0	1	14	4	+10
Uruguay	1	0	1	0	1	1	0
Wales	10	4	1	5	8	6	+2
Total (94)	826	299	208	319	1,172	1,226	−54

== Ranking history ==
	Rank	Date
Best rank	8	June 1995
Current rank	93	November 2026
Worst rank	96	May 2012

== Honours ==
=== Global ===
- FIFA World Cup
  - Fourth place (1): 1994
- Olympic Games
  - (silver) Silver medal (1): 1968
  - (bronze) Bronze medal (1): 1956

=== Regional ===
- Balkan Cup
  - (gold) Champions (3): 1931, 1932, 1976
  - (silver) Runners-up (2): 1935, 1936
  - (bronze) Third place (1): 1933

=== Friendly ===
- FIFA Series
  - (gold) Champions (1): 2026
- Cyprus International Football Tournament
  - (gold) Champions (1): 2007

== See also ==
- Bulgaria national under-21 football team
- Bulgaria national under-19 football team
- Bulgaria national under-18 football team
- Bulgaria national under-17 football team
